= Outline of evidence law in the United States =

Overview of and topical guide to evidence law in the United States

The following outline is provided as an overview of and topical guide to evidence law in the United States:

Evidence law in the United States – sets forth the areas of contention that generally arise in the presentation of evidence in trial proceedings in the U.S.

== Relevance ==
- Relevance
- Public policy doctrines for the exclusion of relevant evidence
- Burden of proof

== Types of evidence ==
- Testimony
  - Laying a foundation
  - Eyewitness identification
  - Character evidence
  - Habit evidence
  - Similar fact evidence
- Documentary evidence
  - Authentication
  - Best evidence rule
  - Self-authenticating documents
  - Ancient documents
  - Parol evidence rule
- Physical evidence
  - Chain of custody
- Real evidence
- Digital evidence
- Exculpatory evidence
- Scientific evidence
  - Genetic (DNA)
- Demonstrative evidence
- Lies

== Judicial notice ==
- Judicial notice

== Witnesses ==
- Witnesses
  - Competence
  - Dead man statute
- Direct examination
- Cross-examination
- Witness impeachment
- Recorded recollection
- Expert witnesses

== Privileges ==
Privilege

== Hearsay and exceptions ==
- Hearsay in English law
- Hearsay in United States law
- Confessions
- Business records exception
- Excited utterance
- Dying declaration
- Party admission
- Ancient documents
- Declarations against interest
- Present sense impression
- Res gestae
- Learned treatise
- Implied assertion

== See also ==
- Outline of law
