= No-impeachment rule =

Police Crime Under Agent Of LK & UK

The no-impeachment rule is a part of U.S. evidence law that generally prohibits jurors from testifying about their deliberations in an attempt to discredit a verdict. Arising in British common law, the rule has come to be implemented in Federal Rule of Evidence (FRE) 606(b) and in each state.

== Background and definition ==
The no-impeachment rule was inaugurated in a 1785 case, Vaise v. Delaval, in which a party sought to challenge a verdict by producing affidavits from jurors who said that they had based their decision on a coin toss. Lord Mansfield rejected these affidavits, thereby initiating a broad common law prohibition against juror testimony about their deliberations, often known as the "Mansfield Rule".

Courts in the United States imported the Mansfield Rule in two varieties. One approach barred jurors from sharing details about what was said in deliberations. This method was codified in FRE 606(b), and it came to be known as the “federal approach.” By contrast, the “Iowa rule” allowed jurors to testify about the deliberations themselves, so long as they never disclosed their own perspective during the deliberations. The “federal approach” is the predominant version of the rule, with 42 jurisdictions in the United States following it.

Specifically, FRE 606(b)(1) stipulates that "[d]uring an inquiry into the validity of a verdict or indictment, a juror may not testify about any statement made or incident that occurred during the jury deliberations; the effect of anything on that juror’s or another juror’s vote; or any juror’s mental processes concerning the verdict or indictment." In practice, this rule restricts the kind of evidence that defendants can provide in a motion for a new trial and in a hearing for that motion.

== Rationale ==
In Tanner v. United States, the Supreme Court offered several rationales for the no-impeachment rule. The rule allows jurors to deliberate candidly, while protecting them from dissatisfied parties. It also protects the jury's verdict from perpetual reexamination, which may threaten the public's confidence in juries and the clarity that comes with a verdict.

== Exceptions ==
FRE 606(b)(2) lists specific exceptions to the no-impeachment rule, noting that jurors “may testify about whether: (A) extraneous prejudicial information was improperly brought to the jury’s attention; (B) an outside influence was improperly brought to bear on any juror; or (C) a mistake was made in entering the verdict on the verdict form.” Under these exceptions, a juror can give post-verdict testimony about issues like a juror's independent legal research, a bailiff's comments to the jury, or an incorrect damages award listed on a verdict form.

The Supreme Court has heard three cases that concern whether the Constitution requires particular exceptions to the no-impeachment rule. In Tanner, the Court held that a jury's use of drugs and alcohol did not constitute an “outside influence” that fit the FRE 606(b)(2) exception, and that the rule barred jurors from impeaching their verdict based on this conduct. The Court reasoned that there were other safeguards in place to protect a defendant's Sixth Amendment right to an impartial jury: prospective jurors are evaluated in voir dire, seated jurors can be monitored by those in court, and non-jurors can testify about a juror's inappropriate behavior even after a verdict has been reached.

In Warger v. Shauers, the Court similarly held that the Sixth Amendment did not require an exception to the no-impeachment rule when a juror had been untruthful in her voir dire responses. It referenced the same safeguards that Tanner had spotlighted, while noting that “[t]here may be cases of juror bias so extreme that, almost by definition, the jury trial right has been abridged.”

In Peña-Rodriguez v. Colorado, the Court held that the Sixth Amendment mandated an exception to the no-impeachment rule when the juror's testimony regards racial animus in jury deliberations. To meet this exception, a defendant must show “that one or more jurors made statements exhibiting overt racial bias,” and “that racial animus was a significant motivating factor in the juror’s vote to convict.”

== See also ==
- Tanner v. United States (1987)
- Peña-Rodriguez v. Colorado (2017)
