= Strict rules of evidence =

Term used in Anglophone law

Strict rules of evidence is a term sometimes used in and about Anglophone common law. The term is not always seen as belonging to technical legal terminology; legislation seldom if ever names a set of laws with the term "strict rules of evidence"; and the term's precise application varies from one legal context to another.

For the purposes of most criminal prosecutions, common law systems have rules about what kinds of evidence can be considered and about how it must be presented, such as the USA Federal Rules of Evidence or the Indian Evidence Act. These rules often disallow, for example, hearsay evidence or bad character evidence. It is generally these rules — or at times the most restrictive form of them — that are being referred to when "the strict rules of evidence" are mentioned.

According to the Council of Europe French-English Legal Dictionary, "(proof according to the) strict rules of evidence" corresponds to the French concept "preuve légale et formelle", as opposed to a situation where "la preuve de la cause est libre" ('the consideration (legal basis) may be proved by any kind of evidence').

A legal system may include different evidentiary standards for different kinds of proceedings, for example for civil and criminal proceedings, and these may all be referred to as "the strict rules of evidence" concerning their particular domain.

The term strict rules of evidence is most commonly used to specify that they are not to be followed. The most common context for this is when a case goes to arbitration instead of to a court of law. Examples in UK law of proceedings not governed by the strict rules of evidence are "civil claims which have been allocated to the small claims track", and "hearings before employment tribunals".

At times, the strict rules of evidence are used to define certain kinds of court cases. For example, section 11 of the UK Civil Evidence Act 1995 specifies that "in this Act 'civil proceedings' means civil proceedings, before any tribunal, in relation to which the strict rules of evidence apply, whether as a matter of law or by agreement of the parties", while section 134 of the UK Criminal Justice Act 2003 defines "criminal proceedings" as "criminal proceedings in relation to which the strict rules of evidence apply".

== See also ==
- Evidence (law)
