= Learned treatise =

Term in law of evidence

A learned treatise, in the law of evidence, is a text that is sufficiently authoritative in its field to be admissible as evidence in a court in support of the contentions made therein.

Under the common law, such evidence was at one time considered hearsay - a statement made out of court being introduced to prove the truth of the statement - and was not admissible except to rebut the testimony of an opposing expert witness. There were four ways to introduce such evidence:

1. Adduce testimony that the opposing expert witness actually used that text to reach his conclusions;
2. Adduce testimony by the opposing expert admitting that the text is an authority in the field;
3. Have a friendly expert witness testifying against the opposing expert witness attest to the authoritativeness of the text.
4. Have the judge take judicial notice of the text, if it is sufficiently notable that the average person would know that it is an authority (for example, Gray's Anatomy).

Under the Federal Rules of Evidence 803 (18), either party can introduce a learned treatise as evidence, irrespective of whether it is being used to rebut the opposing party. Such texts are now considered an exception to hearsay, with two limitations:

1. For the learned treatise to be introduced, there must be an expert witness on the stand;
2. Like a recorded recollection, the actual learned treatise does not go to the jury, but instead comes into evidence only by being read to the jury.
