= Hearsay in United States law =

Hearsay is testimony from a witness who is reciting an out-of-court statement that is being offered to prove the truth of the matter asserted. The Federal Rules of Evidence prohibit introducing hearsay statements during applicable federal court proceedings, unless one of nearly thirty exemptions or exceptions applies. The Federal Rules of Evidence define hearsay as:

A statement that: (1) the declarant does not make while testifying at the current trial or hearing; and (2) a party offers in evidence to prove the truth of the matter asserted in the statement. (F.R.E. 801(c)).

The "declarant" is the person who makes the out-of-court statement. (F.R.E. 801(b)).

The Federal Rules define a "statement" as "a person’s oral assertion, written assertion, or nonverbal conduct, if the person intended it as an assertion". (F.R.E. 801(a)). The Supreme Court has further clarified that a "statement" refers to "a single declaration or remark, rather than a report or narrative". Thus, a trial court must separately analyze each individual statement, "sentence-by-sentence", rather than analyzing the narrative as whole for hearsay content or exceptions.

"The truth of the matter asserted" means the statement itself is being used as evidence to prove the substance of that statement. For example, if a witness says, "Margot told me she loved Matt" to prove that Margot did in fact love Matt, the witness's statement is hearsay. Thus, the reason a party offers a statement is central to determining whether it qualifies as excludable hearsay.

If a statement is being used to prove something other than the truth of what the statement asserts, it is not inadmissible because of the hearsay rule. A good example is the U.S. Supreme Court case of Tennessee v. Street (1985), in which a co-defendant's confession was properly admitted against the defendant—not for the hearsay purpose of directly proving that both men jointly committed a robbery and murder—but for the nonhearsay purpose of rebutting the defendant's claim that his own confession was elicited through the sheriff's coercive tactic of reading his co-defendant's confession to him.

In cases where a statement is being offered for a purpose other than the truth of what it asserts, parties have the right to require the trial judge to give the jury a limiting instruction, mandating the jury consider the evidence only for its intended, non-hearsay purpose.

Although the Federal Rules of Evidence govern federal proceedings only, 38 states have adopted the Uniform Rules of Evidence, which closely track the Federal Rules.

== Rationale for excluding hearsay ==
The rule excluding hearsay arises from a concern regarding the statement's reliability. Courts have four principal concerns with the reliability of witness statements: the witness may be lying (sincerity risk), the witness may have misunderstood the situation (narration risk), the witness's memory may be wrong (memory risk), and the witness's perception was inaccurate (perception risk). Despite these risks, courts allow testimonial evidence because of in-court safeguards "calculated to discover and expose in detail its possible weaknesses, and thus to enable the tribunal (judge or jury) to estimate it at no more than its actual value".

These three safeguards reveal possible weaknesses in a statement:

1. Witnesses must testify under oath
2. Witnesses must be subject to cross-examination
3. Witnesses must be present in court for the fact-finder to assess their demeanor and credibility

Thus, courts prohibit hearsay because of the three missing safeguards intended to assuage reliability concerns of testimonial statements.

In the above example, the witness's statement "Margot told me she loves Matt" is unreliable because Margot is not under oath, she is not subject to cross-examination, and she is not present in court for the fact-finder to assess her credibility. The statement is just too unreliable to be permitted as evidence in court.

== Non-hearsay statements ==
Under the Federal Rules of Evidence, a statement that meets one of the two following conditions is considered not hearsay, and thus admissible. (F.R.E. 801(d)(1))

=== 1. Prior statement of a witness ===
A prior statement by a witness is not hearsay if:

1. the previous statement is inconsistent with the witness's current testimony and the previous statement was made in a proceeding under oath, subject to penalty of perjury. (801(d)(1)(a)); or
2. the previous statement is consistent with the witness's current testimony and the previous statement is being used to rehabilitate the witness's credibility. (801(d)(1)(b)); or
3. it is the witness's own prior identification of a person. (801(d)(1)(c))

For these circumstances to apply, a witness (the "declarant") must be presently testifying in the proceeding and available for cross-examination.

If the prior statement is inconsistent with the current statement, the prior statement may be used both for impeachment (to prove the witness is lying) and substantively (for the truth of what the first statement asserts). Similarly, prior consistent statements being used to rebut an attack on the declarant's credibility, e.g. that the declarant is lying or biased, can be used for rehabilitation and substantively. The drafters of this section of the rules "felt that the jury should not be required to do mental gymnastics here—the jurors should not be asked to separate credibility use from substantive use."

The identification exemption applies, for example, where a witness previously identified someone but cannot remember that identification while testifying during trial. In United States Supreme Court Case United States v. Owens, 484 U.S. 554 (1988), the Court held a victim's previous identification of the defendant as his assailant was admissible under Federal Rule of Evidence 801(d)(1)(c), despite memory problems like being unable to remember seeing his attacker. The rationale of this rule is that prior identifications are more reliable because they happened closer in time to the event than to the court proceeding, and thus are more likely to be accurate than an identification (or lack thereof) in court.

=== 2. Opposing party's statement ===
Any statement made by one party is admissible as non-hearsay if offered by their opposing party. In civil cases, the plaintiff can introduce all statements made by the defense, and the defense can enter all statements made by the plaintiff into evidence.

The Rules list five circumstances in which an opposing party's statement is admissible as non-hearsay:

The statement is offered against an opposing party and:

- (A) was made by the party in an individual or representative capacity;
- (B) is one the party manifested that it adopted or believed to be true;
- (C) was made by a person whom the party authorized to make a statement on the subject;
- (D) was made by the party’s agent or employee on a matter within the scope of that relationship and while it existed; or
- (E) was made by the party’s coconspirator during and in furtherance of the conspiracy.

Bootstrapping. The Rules further explain that the offered statement "does not by itself establish the declarant's authority under (C); the existence or scope of the relationship under (D); or the existence of the conspiracy or participation in it under (E)." This requires the offering party to introduce some independent, corroborative evidence proving the circumstances of C, D, or E are met (as opposed to permitting "bootstrapping", where the statement itself can prove the existence of the conditions). The trial judge then decides, by a preponderance of the evidence, whether these conditions have been proven by evaluating the statement itself and the independent evidence.

Rationale. Unlike other hearsay rules which are concerned principally with reliability, this rule extends common law ideals of adversarial fairness.

== Exceptions to the hearsay rule ==
Under the Federal Rules of Evidence, certain statements that qualify as hearsay are nevertheless admissible as exceptions to the hearsay exclusion rule. Some of these exceptions apply regardless of the declarant's availability to testify in court. See F.R.E. 803(1)-(23). Others apply only when the declarant is unavailable to testify at the trial or hearing. See F.R.E. 804.

Many of the exceptions listed below are treated more extensively in individual articles.

=== Exceptions where the declarant's availability is irrelevant ===
- Excited utterances: Statements relating to startling events or condition made while the declarant was under the stress of excitement caused by the event or condition. This is the exception that may apply to the 'police officer' scenario described below. The victim's cries of help were made under the stress of a startling event, and the victim is still under the stress of the event, as is evidenced by the victim's crying and visible shaking. An excited utterance does not have to be made at the same time of the startling event. A statement made minutes, hours or even days after the startling event can be excited utterances, so long as the declarant is still under the stress of the startling event. However, the more time that elapses between a startling event and the declarant's statement, the more the statements will be looked upon with disfavor.
- Present sense impression: A statement expressing the declarant's impression of a condition existing at the time the statement was made, such as "it's hot in here" or "we're going really fast." Unlike an excited utterance, it need not be made in response to a startling event. Instead, it is admissible because it is a condition that the witness would likely have been experiencing at the same time as the declarant, and would instantly be able to corroborate.
- Declarations of present state of mind (then-existing mental, emotional, or physical condition): Much like a present-sense impression describes the outside world, declarant's statement to the effect of "I am angry!" or "I am Napoleon!" will be admissible to prove that the declarant was indeed angry, or did indeed believe himself to be Napoleon at that time. Used in cases where the declarant's mental state is at issue. Present-state-of-mind statements also includes statements about plans or intent (e.g., "I'm gonna go buy some groceries and get the oil changed in my car on my way home from work"), which can be used as circumstantial evidence of subsequent acts committed by the declarant. However, this exception does not apply to statements about memory or belief that are used to prove the fact remembered, unless the memory/belief is about the validity of terms in the declarant's will.
- Statement made for medical diagnosis or treatment: Another exception is statements made in the course of medical treatment, i.e., statements made by a patient to a medical professional to help in diagnosis and treatment. However, the statement must be reasonably related to the treatment, such as medical history, past or present symptoms or sensations, their inception, or their general cause.
- Business records exception: business records created during the ordinary course of business are considered reliable and can usually be brought in under this exception if the proper foundation is laid when the records are introduced into evidence. Depending on which jurisdiction the case is in, either the records custodian or someone with knowledge of the records must lay a foundation for the records, however. The use of police records, especially as substantive evidence against the accused in a criminal trial, is severely restricted under the Business Records exception. Typically, only generalized evidence about police procedure is admissible under this exception, and not facts about a specific case. For example, John is stopped for speeding 70 miles per hour in a 50-mile-per-hour zone. The officer, who determined John's speed with radar, records the speed in an incident report. He also calibrates and runs a diagnostic on his radar every day prior to beginning his shift. He records this in a log. At trial, the report itself would not be admissible as it pertained to the facts of the case. However, the officer's daily log in which he records his calibration and the daily diagnostics of his radar unit would be admissible under the business records exception.
- Prior inconsistent statements: Many states have departed from the approach of the federal rules with respect to inconsistent statements. Under current law in these jurisdictions, a prior inconsistent statement made by a witness (even when not made under oath at a judicial proceeding or deposition) is admissible as substantive evidence provided the declarant signed the statement.
- Other exceptions, declarant's availability immaterial: In the United States Federal Rules of Evidence, separate exceptions are made for public records, family records, and records in ancient documents of established authenticity. When regular or public records are kept, the absence of such records may also be used as admissible hearsay evidence.

=== Exceptions where the declarant is unavailable ===
- Dying declarations and other statements under belief of impending death: often depicted in films; the police officer asks the person on his deathbed, "Who attacked you?" and the victim replies, "The butler did it." In reality, case law has ruled out this exception in criminal law, because the witness should always be cross-examined in court; however, there is an exception to this exception for criminal cases: even though generally inadmissible to matters relating to criminal law, the exception has been carved out for actions relating to homicide cases [Fed. R. Evid. 804(b)(2)].
- Declaration against interest: A statement that would incriminate or expose the declarant to liability to such an extent that it can be assumed he would only make such a statement if it were true. It would be assumed that one would lie to further one's interests, so a statement against his interests (such as exposing oneself to criminal or civil liability) likely would not be made unless it were true.
  - Admission of guilt: if a declarant makes a statement, verbal or otherwise, as an admission of guilt of the matter at hand, that statement is admissible. Unlike other cases of declarations against interest, the declarant in this situation need not be unavailable.
- Prior testimony: if the testimony was given under oath and the party against whom the testimony is being proffered was present and had the opportunity to cross examine the witness at that time. Often used to enter depositions into the court record at trial.
- Forfeiture by wrongdoing: the party against whom the statement is now offered (1) intentionally made the declarant unavailable; (2) with intent to prevent declarant's testimony; (3) by wrongdoing.

=== Theories supporting exceptions ===
In some jurisdictions, such as Canada, the limited exceptions format to the rule have been replaced by a more general theory of exceptions to the hearsay rule that allows courts to decide when documents, testimony or other evidentiary proof can be used that might not otherwise be considered.

The underlying rationale for many of the hearsay exceptions is that the circumstances of a particular statement make them reliable enough to be heard by a trier of fact. Statements made during the course of medical treatment, for example, are considered reliable because patients typically have little reason to lie to a doctor while they are being treated, and will generally be accurate in describing their ailments.

This, of course, is not always true. Patients do sometimes lie to their doctors (to get painkillers to which they are not entitled, for example). Hearsay exceptions do not mandate that a trier of fact (the jury or, in non-jury trials, the judge) accept the hearsay statement as being true. Hearsay exceptions mean only that the trier of fact will be informed of the hearsay statement and will be allowed to consider it when deciding on a verdict in the case. The jury is free to disregard a hearsay statement if the jury does not believe it. The hearsay rule controls only what out-of-court statements a trier of fact gets to consider in deciding a case, not how they consider the out-of-court statements.

== Hearsay-within-hearsay ==
Hearsay-within-hearsay, or "double hearsay", occurs when multiple out-of-court assertions appear in one statement. For example, if a witness testifies, "Officer Lincoln told me that he interviewed the defendant Claire, who admitted that she committed the robbery." There are two layers of hearsay here; two out-of-court declarants. The first layer is what Officer Lincoln told the witness about conducting an interview. Officer Lincoln is the first declarant: "I interviewed the defendant." The second layer is what the defendant Claire told Officer Lincoln during that interview. Defendant Claire is the second declarant: "I committed the robbery."

The Federal Rules clarify that each layer of hearsay must have an exemption or exception for the entire statement to be admissible. (F.R.E. 805). The second layer of hearsay, what Defendant Claire said about the robbery, can be admitted as an opposing party's statement. But the first layer, Officer Lincoln's statement to the witness, still needs an exception or exemption for the entire statement to be admissible under the hearsay rules.

Rationale. As legal evidence scholar Paul F. Rothstein describes the double-hearsay problem:

One child whispers to the next a message, who whispers it to the next, who whispers it to the next, etc., on down a long line of children. When the last child and the first child compare the message, it is usually found that the two are not very alike.

== Application ==
Generally in common law courts the "hearsay rule" applies, which says that a trier of fact (judge or jury) cannot be informed of a hearsay statement unless it meets certain strict requirements. However, the rules for admissibility are more relaxed in court systems based on the civil law system. In the civil law system, the courts, whether consisting only of judges or featuring a jury, have wide latitude to appreciate the evidence brought before them.

[Note: Louisiana, a civil-law jurisdiction, does not share the above referenced feature generally found in civil-law jurisdictions. With few exceptions, Louisiana follows rules predicated upon the Federal Rules of Evidence.]

Furthermore, even in common-law systems, the hearsay rule only applies to actual trials. Hearsay is admissible as evidence in many other judicial proceedings, such as grand jury deliberations, probation hearings, parole revocation hearings, and proceedings before administrative bodies.

In criminal law, Crawford v. Washington, 541 U.S. 36 (2004), reformulated the standard for determining when the admission of hearsay statements in criminal cases is permitted under the Confrontation Clause of the Sixth Amendment to the United States Constitution. Crawford gives enhanced protection to defendants when the hearsay offered against them is testimonial in nature. When a statement is deliberately accusatory, or when the declarant knows that the statement is likely to be used in the prosecution of the defendant for a crime, the need for face-to-face confrontation is at its highest. When statements are directly accusatory, the defense needs an opportunity to explore the accuser's motives. Where statements are the product of police interrogation, there is a need to ensure that the testimony is not the product of improper coercion or intimidation.

Ohio v. Roberts, 448 U.S. 56 (1980), set forth a two-pronged test in order for hearsay to be admissible against a criminal defendant: (1) the declarant generally must be shown to be unavailable; and (2) the statement must have been made under circumstances providing sufficient "indicia of reliability". With respect to the second prong, a reliability determination may assume that hearsay is sufficiently reliable for constitutional purposes if it satisfies a "firmly rooted" hearsay exception. In practice this means that lower courts need to make reliability determinations only for hearsay that is offered under a "catchall" exception, such as Federal Rule of Evidence Rule 807, or under new or non-traditional hearsay exceptions that are not "firmly rooted". However, Crawford v. Washington overruled Ohio v. Roberts.

== Common misconceptions ==
One major misconception about the hearsay rule is that hearsay is never admissible in court. While the general rule is that such evidence is inadmissible, there are many exceptions.

There are two other common misconceptions concerning the hearsay rule. The first is that hearsay applies only to oral statements. The hearsay rule applies to all out-of-court statements whether oral, written or otherwise. The Federal Rules of Evidence defines a statement as an oral or written assertion or nonverbal conduct of a person, if the conduct is intended by the person as an assertion. Even written documents made under oath, such as affidavits or notarized statements, are subject to the hearsay rule.

The second common misconception is that all out-of-court statements are hearsay. This is not the case. An out of court statement may or may not be hearsay depending on the purpose for which it is offered. If the statement is being offered to prove the truth of what it asserts, then it becomes hearsay. When offered for any other purpose the statement is not hearsay. For example: Witness testifies that yesterday he spoke to Jim (who was in Vermont) on the phone and that Jim made the following statement, "It's raining in Vermont!" If the attorney is seeking to use this statement to prove that it was in fact raining in Vermont, then it is hearsay. But, if the attorney is seeking to use the statement to prove that the phone lines were working that day, or that Jim had not lost the power of speech, or for any other purpose, then the statement is not being offered to prove the truth of the matter asserted, and therefore it is not hearsay.

Consider an additional example:

A police officer, hears cries of "Help, John is trying to kill me!" from inside a house. Believing that there is a crime in progress, the officer kicks the front door down and enters the home to discover the homeowner, John, assaulting a victim, Monica, who is crying and visibly shaking. John is charged with attempted murder. Two separate trials might result from these circumstances.
1. First, a criminal trial against John, who proclaims his innocence and demands a trial for the criminal charges alleged.
2. Second, a civil trial in which John sues the police officer for invading his home, wherein the officer will assert that there was just cause to enter the home because he had a genuine belief that a crime was occurring.

In the first trial, the issue is whether John attempted to kill Monica. The officer is being asked to testify to what Monica said to prove that John attempted to murder Monica, to which he replies that he heard Monica scream from inside the house: "Help, John is trying to kill me!". This statement would be hearsay. Unless the attorney can show that this statement falls within an exception to the hearsay rule, the factfinder (the judge or jury) may not consider Monica's statement (this particular statement, however, would likely be admissible because of the "excited utterance" and "present sense impression" exceptions).

In the second trial, however, the issue is not whether John tried to kill Monica but rather whether the officer's entry into the home was lawful. Here, the statement is not being offered to prove that John tried to kill Monica, but it instead is being offered to prove that the officer had probable cause to enter the home. Whether John was actually trying to kill Monica is irrelevant to the issue at hand; what matters is whether the officer believed that Monica was in danger and whether it had been necessary to kick down the door to investigate further. Monica's statement is evidence to that effect because a reasonable person, having heard Monica's cries for help, would fear for Monica's safety. A person's own prior statements can be hearsay. For example, suppose a person is testifying on the stand. In relation to an automobile accident where a blue truck struck a yellow car, the witness testifies, "I told the police officer the truck was blue" to establish the color of the car (as opposed to whether he had lied to police, or the officer had falsified the witness reports). This statement is an out-of-court statement offered for the purpose of proving the truth of the matter asserted, and is therefore hearsay. The witness is testifying about what someone said in the past. The fact that it is his own statement does not change the hearsay nature of the statement.

If the witness testifies, "The truck that struck the yellow car was blue", the statement is not hearsay. The witness is not testifying about a past statement. He is not relating in court what someone outside of court said, but is merely relating an observation.

The rule that a person's own statements can be considered hearsay may be confusing. By "forgetting" who is testifying on the stand and merely looking for statements like "I said", "I wrote", "I testified before that", "The document says", and the like, most confusion can be eliminated.

In this example, simple logic tells that there is a difference: while the first statement may be true, it does not assert anything about the truth of the matter stated. The witness may have told the officer that the truck was blue, but that may not have been the truth; he might have been mistaken or lying.

== See also ==
- List of objections (law)
