= Simon Greenleaf =

American lawyer and jurist (1783–1853)

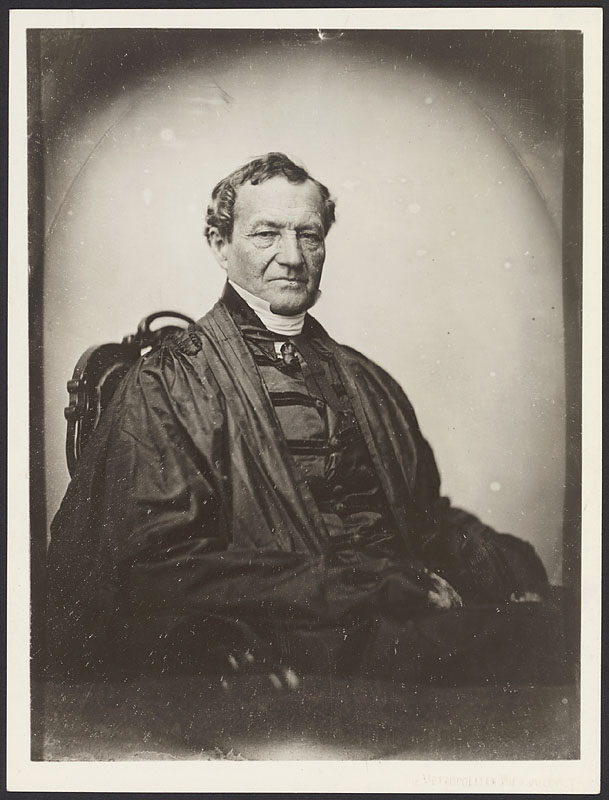
Simon Greenleaf.

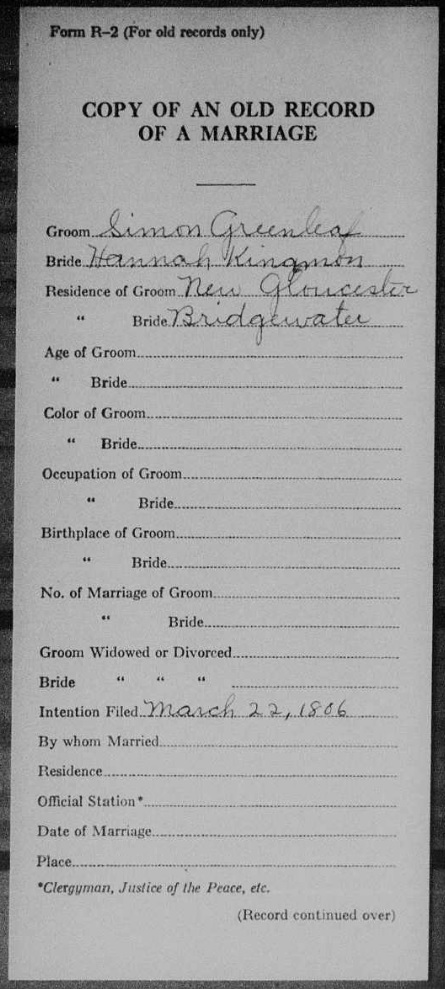
The March 22nd 1806 Marriage record of Simon Greenleaf and Hannah Kingman

Simon Greenleaf (December 5, 1783 – October 6, 1853) was an American lawyer and jurist. He was a professor of law at Harvard University and wrote the influential Treatise on the Law of Evidence and Testimony of the Evangelists

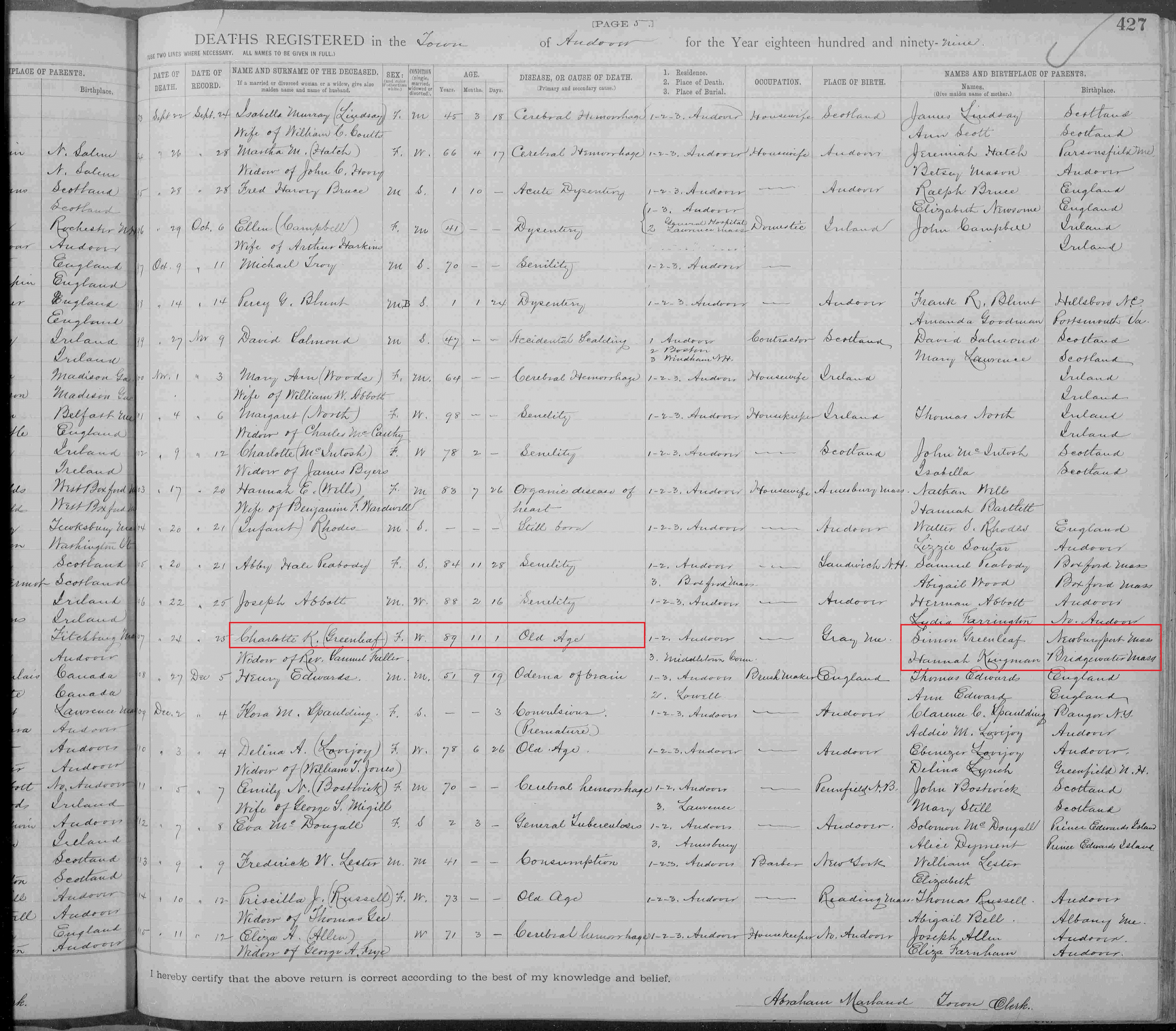
1899 - Death Record of Simon Greenleaf's daughter Charlotte K. Greenleaf Fuller, showing Simon Greenleaf, his wife, and their birth places.

== Early life and legal career ==
He was born in Newburyport, Massachusetts. His parents moved to New Gloucester, which was in Massachusetts but is now in Maine, which left him in Newburyport, Massachusetts, under the care of his grandfather Jonathan Greenleaf. There, Simon was educated at the Latin school and studied the Greco-Roman classics. When he turned 16, he rejoined his parents in New Gloucester.

In 1801, he joined the law office of Ezekiel Whitman (later the Chief Justice of Maine) and in 1806 was admitted to the Cumberland County bar as a legal practitioner. On 22 March 1806, in New Gloucester, he married Hannah Kingman.

He then opened a legal practice at Standish, Maine, but six months later relocated to Gray, Maine, where he practised for twelve years and in 1818 moved to Portland, Maine. Greenleaf's political preferences were aligned with the Federalist Party, and in 1816, he was an unsuccessful candidate for that party in Cumberland County for the Senate. He was reporter of the Supreme Court of Maine from 1820 to 1832 and published nine volumes of Reports of Cases in the Supreme Court of Maine (1820–1832).

Greenleaf was elected a member of the American Antiquarian Society in 1820.

He was awarded an honorary Doctor of Laws degree by Harvard University in 1834. He received the same honor from Amherst College in 1845 and again from the University of Alabama in 1852. In 1848, he was elected as a member of the American Philosophical Society.

== Professorships ==
In 1833, Greenleaf was named to the Royall professorship and in 1846 succeeded Judge Joseph Story as Dane professor of law at Harvard. Greenleaf contributed extensively to the development of Harvard Law School, including the expansion of the Harvard Law Library. He was retained as chief counsel by the Warren Bridge group in the US Supreme Court case Charles River Bridge v. Warren Bridge 36 U.S. 420 (1837), which laid down the rule that public contracts must be construed in favor of states.

In 1848, Greenleaf retired from his active duties and became professor emeritus. After being for many years president of the Massachusetts Bible Society, he died in Cambridge, Massachusetts. His well-known work,Treatise on the Law of Evidence, is considered a classic of American jurisprudence.

== Contributions to Christian apologetics ==
Greenleaf is an important figure in the development of the Christian school of thought known as legal or juridical apologetics. The school of thought is typified by legally trained scholars applying the canons of legal proof and judicial argument to the defense of Christian belief. Greenleaf's Testimony of the Evangelists (1846) set the model for many subsequent works by legal apologists. He is considered as one who applied the canons of the ancient document rule to establish the authenticity of the gospel accounts, as well as cross-examination principles, to assess the testimony of those who bore witness to the crucifixion and resurrection of Christ. Greenleaf's style of reasoning is reflected in the apologetic works by John Warwick Montgomery (1931-2024), Josh McDowell (1939- ), and Ross Clifford (1951- ).

Several evangelical books and websites portray Greenleaf as an atheist who set out to disprove the gospel and claim that the evidence for Jesus' resurrection convinced him instead to become a Christian. Greenleaf was a devout evangelical Episcopalian, and no evidence exists that he ever doubted the truth of the gospels.

== Other writings ==
Greenleaf's principal work of legal scholarship is Treatise on the Law of Evidence (3 vols., 1842–1853), which remained a standard textbook in American law throughout the 19th century. He also published A Full Collection of Cases Overruled, Denied, Doubted, or Limited in their Application, taken from American and English Reports (1821). He prepared and published Reports of Cases Argued and Determined by the Supreme Judicial Court of the State of Maine in nine volumes (1820–1832). He revised for the American courts William Cruise's Digest of Laws respecting Real Property (3 vol., 1849–1850).

Greenleaf was also the author of A Brief Inquiry into the Origin and Principles of Free Masonry (1820), and he wrote a memoir of the life of his colleague Joseph Story, A Discourse Commemorative of the Life and Character of the Hon. Joseph Story (1845).

He is mentioned by the actress Marium Carvell, playing Selma Davis, in Apocalypse IV: Judgment

== Simon Greenleaf School of Law ==
In 1980, the Simon Greenleaf School of Law opened its doors at Trinity Lutheran Church, 4101 Nohl Ranch Road, Anaheim, California, 92807. In August 1982, it was relocated to 3855 East La Palma Avenue, Anaheim, California, 92807 and was named in his honor, The school was founded by the Lutheran theologian-lawyer John Warwick Montgomery. From 1980 to 1988, the law school published a journal The Simon Greenleaf Law Review. In 1997 the law school became part of Trinity International University.

== Bibliography ==
- Simon Greenleaf, The Testimony of the Evangelists Examined by The Rules of Evidence Administered in Courts of Justice, reprint of the 1874 edition, (Grand Rapids: Baker Book House, 1984). ISBN 0-8010-3803-0
- Simon Greenleaf, "The Testimony of the Evangelists," reprinted from the 1903 edition as an appendix in John Warwick Montgomery, The Law Above The Law, (Minneapolis: Bethany Fellowship, 1975), pp. 91–140 & 149-163. ISBN 0-87123-329-0

== See also ==
=== Topics ===
- Christian Apologetics
- Arguments for the Existence of God
- Thomism
- Evidentialist
- Testimony of the Evangelist
- The Case for Christ

=== Apologists ===
- Ross Clifford
- Josh McDowell
- John Warwick Montgomery
- Lee Strobel
