= Warger v. Shauers =

- Supreme Court of the United States

Argued October 8, 2014 Decided December 9, 2014
- Full case name: Warger v. Shauers
- Docket no.: 13-517
- Citations: 574 U.S. 40 (more) 135 S. Ct. 521; 190 L. Ed. 2d 422
- Argument: Oral argument

Case history
- Prior: 721 F.3d 606 (8th Cir. 2013); cert. granted, 571 U.S. 1236 (2014).

Holding
- Jurors may not testify about what occurred during jury deliberations, even to expose other jurors who were dishonest during voir dire.

Court membership
- Chief Justice John Roberts Associate Justices Antonin Scalia · Anthony Kennedy; Clarence Thomas · Ruth Bader Ginsburg; Stephen Breyer · Samuel Alito; Sonia Sotomayor · Elena Kagan

Case opinion
- Majority: Sotomayor, joined by unanimous

Laws applied
- Federal Rule of Evidence 606(b)

Warger v. Shauers, 574 U.S. 40 (2014), was a unanimous decision by the United States Supreme Court, ruling that jurors may not testify about what occurred during jury deliberations, even to expose dishonesty during jury selection or voir dire. The Court delivered its ruling on December 9, 2014.

== Background ==
Gregory Warger and Randy Shauers were involved in a traffic accident in Rapid City, South Dakota. Warger sustained severe injuries that required the amputation of his left leg. Warger then sued Shauers for negligence in a Federal District Court, but the jury reached a verdict in favor of Shauers. After the trial, one of the jurors contacted Warger's lawyer, claiming that the jury's forewoman was biased (something that was not revealed during jury selection): she stated during deliberations that her daughter was at fault in a fatal traffic accident and "that if her daughter had been sued, it would have ruined her life". Warger then asked for a new trial based on the juror's statement, stating that he fulfilled the requirements of McDonough Power Equipment, Inc. v. Greenwood (1984). Both the District Court and later the Eighth Circuit ruled that the juror's testimony about any statement made during deliberations were inadmissible under Federal Rule of Evidence 606(b).

== Opinion of the Court ==
Justice Sonia Sotomayor delivered the unanimous judgment of the Court, affirming the lower court's ruling that Federal Rule of Evidence 606(b) "applies to any proceeding in which the jury's verdict might be invalidated, including efforts to demonstrate that a juror lied". She cited Tanner v. United States (1987), which ruled that juror testimony to impeach a jury verdict were inadmissible. She also noted that there are other ways to remove biased jurors, for example "parties may bring to the court's attention evidence of bias before the verdict is rendered and use non-juror evidence after the verdict is rendered." Furthermore, Sotomayor argued that the jury's forewoman's experiences with her daughter's accident did not qualify as "extraneous prejudicial information", an exception to Rule 606(b): "[Her] daughter's accident may well have informed her general views about negligence liability for car crashes, but it did not provide either her or the rest of the jury with any specific knowledge regarding Shauers' collision with Warger".

== See also ==
- List of United States Supreme Court cases
- List of United States Supreme Court cases, volume 574
