= Recorded recollection =

Legal exception to the hearsay rule

A recorded recollection (sometimes referred to as a prior recollection recorded), in the law of evidence, is an exception to the hearsay rule which allows witnesses to testify to the accuracy of a recording or documentation of their own out-of-court statement based on their recollection of the circumstances under which the statement was recorded or documented – even though the witness does not remember the events attested to in the statement. It is sufficient that the witness is able to testify to having made the recording, and to having written an accurate statement at that time. In the Third Circuit, the witness need not even make or draft the statement, but only accept it as their own.

Under the Federal Rules of Evidence, § 803 (5), a recorded recollection is defined as follows:

A memorandum or record concerning a matter about which a witness once had knowledge but now has insufficient recollection to enable the witness to testify fully and accurately, shown to have been made or adopted by the witness when the matter was fresh in the witness' memory and to reflect that knowledge correctly. If admitted, the memorandum or record may be read into evidence but may not itself be received as an exhibit unless offered by an adverse party.

The rule is followed by most U.S. states as laid out in the Federal Rules of Evidence; the evidence thus presented may be read into the record, but the actual recording or document may not be given to the jury, except under very narrow circumstances.

== See also ==
- Federal Rules of Civil Procedure
- Federal Rules of Criminal Procedure
- Federal Rules of Evidence
- Hearsay in English law
- Hearsay in United States law
- New York law
