= Testimony of the Evangelists =

1846 Christian apologetic work by Simon Greenleaf

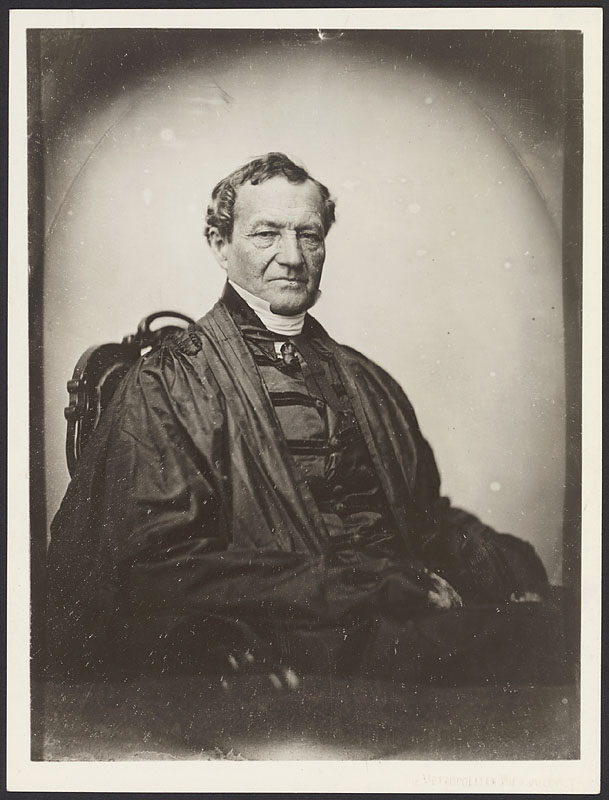
Simon Greenleaf

The Testimony of the Evangelists, Examined by the Rules of Evidence Administered in Courts of Justice is an 1846 Christian apologetic work by Simon Greenleaf (1783-1853), an early professor (1833-1848) of the Harvard Law School (founded in 1817).

Greenleaf's Treatise on the Law of Evidence, published in three volumes between 1842 and 1853, forms the basis for his study of the Gospels. Greenleaf came to the conclusion that the New Testament evangelists classed as reliable witnesses, and that the resurrection of Jesus occurred. In the 21st century, contemporary Christian apologists sometimes cite Testimony of the Evangelists.

== Summary ==
Greenleaf begins his book by arguing for the need to suspend prejudices and to be open to conviction, "to follow the truth wherever it may lead us" (p. 1). He cites Bishop Daniel Wilson's Evidences by stating that Christianity does not "bring irresistible evidence" but offers sufficient evidences for "the serious inquirer" (p. 2). He limits the scope of his book to an inquiry "to the testimony of the Four Evangelists, bringing their narratives to the tests to which other evidence is subjected in human tribunals" (p. 2). His specific inquiry is concerned with testing "the veracity of these witnesses by the same rules and means" employed in human tribunals (p. 3). Greenleaf argues the case by first inquiring as to the genuineness of the four gospels as ancient writings. Here he applies what is known in law as the ancient documents rule, stating that "Every document, apparently ancient, coming from the proper repository or custody, and bearing on its face no evident marks of forgery, the law presumes to be genuine, and devolves on the opposing party the burden of proving it to be otherwise" (p. 7). Greenleaf maintains that the Four Gospels do not bear any marks of being forgeries and the oldest extant copies may be received into court as genuine documents.

Greenleaf proceeds to argue that "In matters of public and general interest, all persons must be presumed to be conversant, on the principle that individuals are presumed to be conversant with their own affairs" (p. 9). On the basis of this legal rule, Greenleaf briefly profiles those traditionally attributed as authors of the Four Gospels, Matthew, Mark, Luke and John, concerning (in the case of John and Matthew) their firsthand knowledge of the life of Jesus of Nazareth and (in the case of Mark and Luke) their intimate personal links with Jesus' original band of disciples.

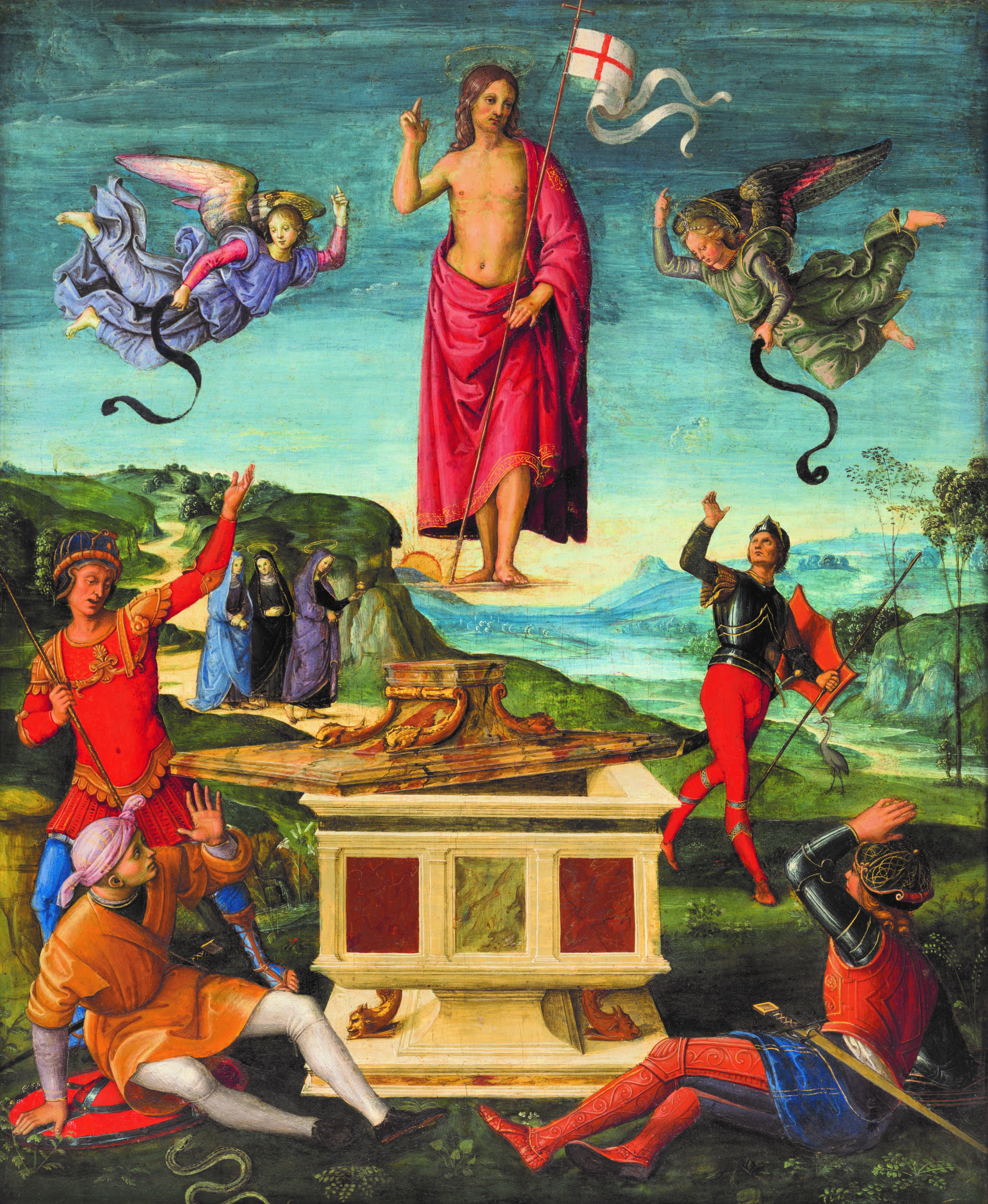
Resurrection of Jesus Christ (Kinnaird Resurrection) by Raphael, 1502

Greenleaf then builds a cumulative case by claiming to cross-examine the oral testimony of the evangelists in their accounts of the death and resurrection of Jesus. Greenleaf develops his case on the basis of the following tests:

"The credit due to the testimony of witnesses depends upon, firstly, their honesty; secondly, their ability; thirdly, their number and the consistency of their testimony; fourthly, the conformity of their testimony with experience; and fifthly, the coincidence of their testimony with collateral circumstances" (p. 28).

Greenleaf then argues that the gospel writers can be shown to be honest in their character and do not show any motives to falsify their testimony (pp. 28–31). He claims that keen observations and meticulous details are related by Matthew and Luke, and he concludes this demonstrates their ability (pp. 31–32). Greenleaf notes that there are parallel accounts from the evangelists concerning the central events of Jesus' life and that these accounts are not verbally identical. He maintains that discrepancies in their accounts are evidence that the writers are not guilty of collusion, and that the discrepancies in their respective accounts can be resolved or harmonized upon careful cross-examination and comparison of the details (pp 32–35). Greenleaf argues against the scepticism of the Scottish empirical philosopher David Hume concerning reports of miracles. He finds fault with Hume's position about "immutable laws from the uniform course of human experience" (p. 36), and goes on to assert that it is a fallacy because "it excludes all knowledge derived by inference or deduction from facts, confining us to what we derive from experience alone" (pp. 37–38). Greenleaf takes as his own assumption that as God exists then such a being is capable of performing miracles. He then argues that the various miracles reported in Jesus' ministry occurred in open or public contexts where friend and foe alike were witnesses (pp 39–42). Lastly, Greenleaf examines the problem of uniform testimony among false and genuine witnesses, and finds there is sufficient circumstantial evidence to support the accounts of the Four Evangelists.

Greenleaf sums up his argument with the following plea:

"All that Christianity asks of men on this subject, is, that they would be consistent with themselves; that they would treat its evidences as they treat the evidence of other things; and that they would try and judge its actors and witnesses, as they deal with their fellow men, when testifying to human affairs and actions, in human tribunals. Let the witnesses be compared with themselves, with each other, and with the surrounding facts and circumstances; and let their testimony be sifted, as if it were given in a court of justice, on the side of the adverse party, the witnesses being subjected to a rigorous cross-examination. The result, it is confidently believed, will be an undoubting conviction of their integrity, ability and truth ... Either the men of Galilee were men of superlative wisdom, and extensive knowledge and experience, and of deeper skill in the arts of deception, than any and all others, before or after them, or they have truly stated the astonishing things which they saw and heard" (pp. 46 & 53).

== Literary importance in Christian apologetics ==
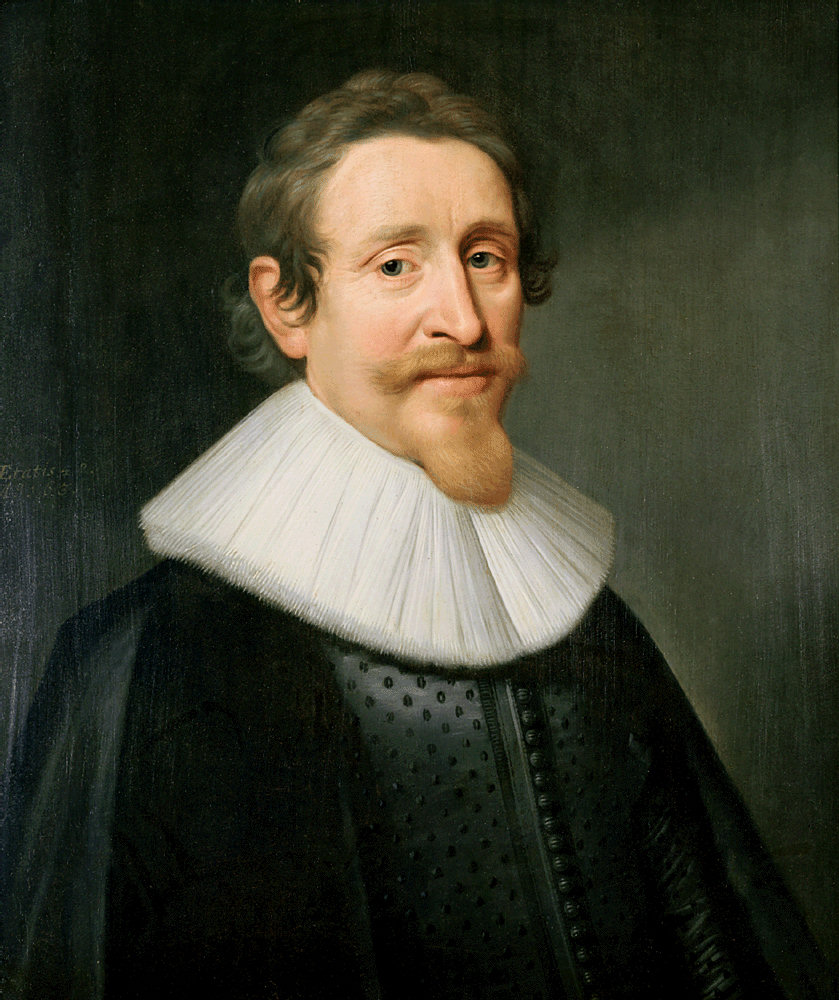
Hugo Grotius

In the history of Christian apologetics there have been many lawyers who have written texts commending and defending their faith. In recent years writers such as John Warwick Montgomery, Ross Clifford and Philip Johnson have described the contributions made by lawyers as a distinct school of thought and use the terms "juridical apologetics", "jural apologetics" and "legal apologetics". These writers point to the Seventeenth century Dutch legal scholar Hugo Grotius as one of the first juridical apologists. Montgomery, Clifford and Johnson argue that Greenleaf may be ranked as one of the most important representative figures of this particular school of apologetic thought. Johnson states that Greenleaf, "must be regarded as the pivotal figure in juridical apologetics."

As a Christian apologist of the mid-Nineteenth century, Greenleaf was one of many writers who contributed to the debates that ensued on both sides of the Atlantic concerning the historicity of the gospel accounts in general, and specifically the miracle of the resurrection of Jesus Christ. Part of his argument relied on earlier Christian apologists such as William Paley, Thomas Hartwell Horne, and Mark Hopkins, and he cites their works in The Testimony of the Evangelists. Here he followed the basic appeals to logic, reason, and historical evidences on behalf of the Bible generally, and in defence of the possibility of miracles occurring.

However, what distinguished Greenleaf from previous apologists is that he is the first American apologist to develop an argument favoring the reliability of the gospels and specifically on the evidences for the resurrection of Jesus Christ using technical legal criteria. His technical arguments concerning the evidentiary weight of the eyewitness passages found in the gospel narratives, the criteria for cross-examining that eyewitness testimony, and the claimed status of the gospels as competent evidence, have been relied on and restated by several American Christian apologists of the nineteenth and twentieth centuries, such as Clarence Bartlett (As A Lawyer Sees Jesus), Walter M. Chandler (The Trial of Jesus), Pamela Binnings Ewen (Faith on Trial), Francis J. Lamb (Miracle and Science), Irwin H. Linton (A Lawyer Examines the Bible), Josh McDowell (More Than A Carpenter, The Resurrection Factor), Howard Hyde Russell (A Lawyer's Examination of the Bible), Joseph Evans Sagebeer (The Bible in Court), and Stephen D. Williams (The Bible in Court or Truth vs Error).

== Critical assessment ==
Ross Clifford, who is a former Australian barrister and a theologian, has often written about the subject of legal apologists. Clifford affirms the case for the resurrection of Jesus. He states that it may appear to opponents that legal apologists like Greenleaf have at different points overstated their case. In his first book Leading Lawyers' Case for the Resurrection he devoted a brief chapter on Greenleaf's life and work. In that text he raised a technical question about the ancient documents rule and suggested that hypothetically a court could admit the gospels as ancient documents, but that does not mean that their specific contents are automatically acknowledged as facts (p. 141). However, the trier of fact is allowed to weigh the evidence of the contents of the writings. Clifford clarifies the purpose of the ancient documents rule in his book John Warwick Montgomery's Legal Apologetic (pp. 51–65). Clifford says that apologists may appear to their opponents to have overstated their conclusions based on the ancient documents rule. But Clifford supports Greenleaf's and Montgomery's legal apologetic approach. Clifford states:

"The 'Ancient Documents' rule at common law has traditionally related more to the authentication of the document than with the admissibility of its contents. It does not automatically lead to admission of the substance of the document irrespective of its credibility. (It can be argued this is even true today for the United States, even though the Federal Rule of Evidence 803 [16] states statements in Ancient Documents are admissible as exemptions to hearsay). Greenleaf takes no cognisance of this position and asserts that when an instrument is admitted under the said rule the court is bound to receive into evidence its substance as well unless the opposing party is able to impeach it ... The question as to whether the authentication of the gospels under the 'Ancient Documents' rule leads to receiving their substance into evidence is contentious. It could be strongly pleaded there is justification for doing so. Yet, it should be noted such pleading would be met by the adverse party's strong rejoinder" (pp. 60-61 & 63).

== Bibliography of legal apologists influenced by Greenleaf ==
- Clarence Bartlett, As A Lawyer Sees Jesus: A Logical Analysis of the Scriptural and Historical Record, (New York: Greenwich Book Publishers, 1960).
- Walter M. Chandler, The Trial of Jesus From A Lawyer's Standpoint, (Norcross: Harrison Company, 1976).
- Pamela Binnings Ewen, Faith on Trial, (Nashville: Broadman & Holman, 1999). ISBN 0-8054-2026-6
- Francis J. Lamb, Miracle and Science: Bible Miracles Examined by the Methods, Rules and Tests of the Science of Jurisprudence as Administered Today in Courts of Justice, (Oberlin: Bibliotheca Sacra Company, 1909).
- Irwin H. Linton, A Lawyer Examines the Bible, reprint edition, (Grand Rapids: Baker Book House, 1977). ISBN 0-8010-5565-2
- Josh McDowell, More Than A Carpenter, (Wheaton: Tyndale House, 1977). ISBN 0-8423-4552-3
- Josh McDowell, The Resurrection Factor, (San Bernardino: Here's Life Publishers, 1981). ISBN 0-918956-72-2
- John Warwick Montgomery, "The Jury Returns: A Juridical Defense of Christianity," in Evidence For Faith: Deciding the God Question, edited by John Warwick Montgomery, (Dallas: Probe, 1991), pp. 319–341. ISBN 0-945241-15-1
- Robert Clifton Robinson, Legal Analysis Of The Four Gospels As Valid Eyewitness Testimony, (https://robertcliftonrobinson.com/2019/07/19/legal-analysis-of-the-four-gospels-as-valid-eyewitness-testimony/, 2019)
- Howard Hyde Russell, A Lawyer's Examination of the Bible, (Westerville: Bible Bond, 1935).
- Joseph Evans Sagebeer, The Bible in Court, reprint edition, (Littleton: Fred B. Rothman, 1988). ISBN 0-8377-2620-4
- Stephen D. Williams, The Bible in Court or Truth vs. Error, (Dearborn: Dearborn Book Concern, 1925).

== Critical assessments of legal apologetics and Greenleaf's book ==
- Ross Clifford, John Warwick Montgomery's Legal Apologetic: An Apologetic for all Seasons, (Bonn: Verlag fur Kultur und Wissenschaft, 2004). ISBN 3-938116-00-5
- Boyd Pehrson, "How Not To Critique Legal Apologetics: A Lesson from a Skeptic's Internet Page Objections," Global Journal of Classical Theology, Vol. 3, no. 1 (March 2002).
