= Jabal al-'Awd =

Mountain in the Highlands of Yemen

- Location within Yemen

Highest point
- Elevation: 2,942 m (9,652 ft)
- Coordinates: 14°03′04″N 44°26′18″E

Jabal al-'Awd (Arabic: جبل العود) is a mountain in the Highlands of Yemen. It has an elevation of 2,942 meters and is the 67th highest mountain in Yemen. It is situated about 25 km south-east of the ancient Himyarite capital of Zafar.

== History ==
The place name ʿwd appears in Old South Arabian inscriptions, and probably refers to the same location as the present day. In ancient times it fell in the administrative district known as Ibb, near Wadi Bana. The mountain had mainly been known as the site of a podium temple dating back to the middle of the first millennium BC, and settlements in the area were mentioned in the Res Gestae of the Sabaean king Karib'il Watar of Ṣirwāḥ.

Jabal al-'Awd had been known since the 19th century for its Qatabānian rock inscription. In the 1970s a French epigraphist, Christian Robin, copied a few of the inscriptions. In the winter of 1996 the attention of archaeologists was finally alerted to the importance of the site thanks to illicit excavations there which had unearthed amazing bronzes, in both South Arabian and Mediterranean styles. In 1998 the German Archaeological Institute requested permission from the Yemeni Archaeology Authority to start official excavations of the site, primarily to establish where exactly the illicitly excavated objects were found, and also to investigate further any evidence of cultural relations between Yemen and especially the Mediterranean in early Himyaritic times. The German Archaeological Institute subsequently sent six field campaigns to the mountain, though their work was interrupted in 2003 for three years due to tribal unrest. The German archaeologists found that the previous illicit finds had been unearthed from a huge building complex, apparently a large residence with a courtyard, and further digging produced many more important finds, including statues, items of furniture and vessels.

The settlement contained a burial site, and many of the dead had been buried with rich goods: pottery, stone vessels, weapons, jewellery and amulets. They found a lot of goods that had been imported from the Mediterranean (rings and glass for example), and goods that has been made in South Arabia but in Mediterranean styles.

The results of the excavations so far show that the site was a major settlement between the 1st century BC and the 3rd century AD; this was then suddenly destroyed and set on fire. This disaster coincided with the first Abyssinian invasion of Yemen, and that must have been the cause of the destruction. The town was never completely settled again, though a few houses here and there were repaired. The archaeologists found evidence of more recent dwellings too, and pottery finds show that some of these were Medieval.

== Bibliography ==
Vogt, B./Gerlach, I./Hitgen, H. "Die Erforschung Altsüdarabiens. Das Deutsche Archäologische Institut Sana'a auf den Spuren des Sabäerherrschers Karib'il Watar". Nürnberger Blätter zur Archäologie 15 (1998) 133–152. (in German)
