= Excited utterance =

Legal term

An excited utterance, in the law of evidence, is a statement made by a person in response to a startling or shocking event or condition. It is an unplanned reaction to a "startling event". It is an exception to the hearsay rule. The statement must be spontaneously made by the person (the declarant) while still under the stress of excitement from the event or condition. The subject matter and content of the statement must "relate to" the event or condition in question. The statement could be a description or explanation (as required for present sense impression), or an opinion or inference. Examples include: "Look out! We're going to crash!" or "I think he's crazy. He's shooting at us!" The basis for this hearsay exception is the belief that a statement made under the stress is likely to be trustworthy and unlikely to be a premeditated falsehood. Compared to present sense impression, excited utterance is broader in scope for permitting a longer time lapse between event and statement, and a wider range of content in the statement.

Under the Federal Rules of Evidence, an excited utterance is a hearsay exception, and is admissible to prove the truth of the statement itself (e.g., in the case of the first quotation above, to prove that the vehicle the declarant was riding in was, in fact, about to crash). To prove the truth of the statement means to persuade the finder of fact to believe the affirmative sense of the statement. "Truth" here does not mean truth from the subjective point of view of the declarant or from the objective point of view of a reasonably prudent person. It simply refers to the affirmative assertion of the statement.

Spontaneity of the declarant is a key to admissibility. An excited utterance does not have to be made at time of the startling event, but must be made while the declarant is still in a state of surprise or shock from the incident. The declarant's reflective powers must be stilled, meaning that, while making the statement, the declarant would not have had a chance to reflect upon the startling event, fabricate a purposefully false statement, and then say it. If the declarant is believed to have had time to reflect on the situation before making the statement, the statement would not be spontaneous and thus not an excited utterance. However, under certain circumstances, it is possible for days to have passed before the declarant fully reflects on the event, and "unstills" his or her reflective powers.

Spontaneity is established by the declarant's demeanor, time lapse, and content of the statement. Declarant's appearance of calmness at time statement lessens admissibility. Time lapse between the startling event and the statement is a factor for both admissibility and weight. A statement made long after the event may be deemed less spontaneous than one made contemporaneously or shortly after. Outer limit of the permissible time lapse can only be determined from the circumstances of a particular case. For example, if a declarant made a statement six days after a car crash due to the extent of his injuries, admissibility of the statement is diminished because of the significant passage of time. However, if evidence shows that he was continuously distraught and did not yet have a chance to reflect upon the crash, the statement could be admissible but may have less weight than if the statement had been made one hour after the crash. A complete and detailed statement may infer the lack of spontaneity, as a narrative of a past completed event would require the declarant's reflection and organization. A similar case involved a woman who had been in a coma for thirty days following a car crash. When she awoke and was told what had happened she exclaimed "I must have fallen asleep!" At trial, her statement was admitted even though a month had passed because the startling event was perceived to be the telling of the news, as opposed to the crash itself.

== See also ==
- Kinsley gaffe
