= Statement against penal interest =

Statement type under United States law

In United States law, a statement against penal interest is a statement that puts the statement-maker at risk of prosecution. It is the criminal equivalent of a statement against interest, a statement a person would not normally make, which would put them in a disadvantaged position that they would have had if they had not made the statement in the first place.

In certain circumstances, it can be a factor in allowing as evidence statements that would otherwise be excluded through the law of hearsay.
