= Declaration against interest =

Concept in US law regarding testimony

In United States law, a declaration (or statement) against interest is an exception to the rule on hearsay in which a person's statement may be used, where generally the content of the statement is so prejudicial to the person making it that they would not have made the statement unless they believed the statement was true. For example, if a driver in an automobile accident boasts publicly that they were speeding, it may represent a legal admission of liability.

The Federal Rules of Evidence limit the bases of prejudices to the declarant to tort and criminal liability. Some states, such as California, extend the prejudice to "hatred, ridicule, or social disgrace in the community." It is analogous to the criminal equivalent, the statement against penal interest which is a statement that puts the person making the statement at risk of criminal prosecution. In the United States federal court system and many state courts, statements against interest by individuals who are not available to be called at trial (but not other persons) may be admitted as evidence where in other circumstances they would be excluded as hearsay.

The admissibility of evidence under the declaration against interest exception to the hearsay rule is often limited by the Confrontation Clause of the Sixth Amendment.

A declaration against interest differs from a party admission because here the declarant does not have to be a party to the case but must have a basis for knowing that the statement is true. Furthermore, evidence of the statement will only be admissible if the declarant is unavailable to testify.

== Codes ==
Under the Federal Rules of Evidence, Rule 804(b)(3) provides:

"A statement that:

(A) a reasonable person in the declarant's position would have made only if the person believed it to be true because, when made, it was so contrary to the declarant's proprietary or pecuniary interest or had so great a tendency to invalidate the declarant's claim against someone else or to expose the declarant to civil or criminal liability; and

(B) is supported by corroborating circumstances that clearly indicate its trustworthiness, if it is offered in a criminal case as one that tends to expose the declarant to criminal liability." See Fed. R. Evid. 804(b)(3). The rule was last amended on December 1, 2010. See Legislative History (with links to key documents).

Under California's Evidence Code § 1230 defines "Declarations against interest" as:

Evidence of a statement by a declarant having sufficient knowledge of the subject is not made inadmissible by the hearsay rule if the declarant is unavailable as a witness and the statement, when made, was so far contrary to the declarant's pecuniary or proprietary interest, or so far subjected him to the risk of civil or criminal liability, or so far tended to render invalid a claim by him against another, or created such a risk of making him an object of hatred, ridicule, or social disgrace in the community, that a reasonable man in his position would not have made the statement unless he believed it to be true.

== See also ==
- Criterion of embarrassment
