= Tanner v. United States =

- Supreme Court of the United States

Argued March 31, 1987 Decided June 22, 1987
- Full case name: William M. Conover and Anthony R. Tanner v. United States
- Citations: 483 U.S. 107 (more) 107 S. Ct. 2739; 97 L. Ed. 2d 90; 1987 U.S. LEXIS 2868; 55 U.S.L.W. 4942

Case history
- Prior: 772 F.2d 765 (11th Cir. 1985)

Holding
- The lower courts were correct in denying a hearing on juror misconduct.

Court membership
- Chief Justice William Rehnquist Associate Justices William J. Brennan Jr. · Byron White; Thurgood Marshall · Harry Blackmun; Lewis F. Powell Jr. · John P. Stevens; Sandra Day O'Connor · Antonin Scalia

Case opinions
- Majority: O'Connor, joined by unanimous court (parts III, IV); Rehnquist, White, Powell, Scalia (parts I, II)
- Concur/dissent: Marshall, joined by Brennan, Blackmun, Stevens

Laws applied
- Federal Rules of Evidence § 606(b)

Tanner v. United States, 483 U.S. 107 (1987), was a United States Supreme Court case in which the Court held that juror testimony could not be used to discredit or overturn a jury verdict, even if the jury had been consuming copious amounts of alcohol, marijuana, and cocaine throughout the course of the trial.

== Background ==
After the defendant was found guilty of mail fraud, his attorneys filed several motions after learning that seven of the jurors had consumed alcohol during the trial's noon recesses. Four of the jurors had consumed, between them "a pitcher to three pitchers" of beer during various recesses. Of the other three, one juror reported that he had observed two jurors drinking one or two mixed drinks on several occasions during lunch recess, while another juror, the foreperson, had consumed liter of wine on each of three occasions.

The attorneys also uncovered evidence of drug use among the jurors. Juror Hardy testified that he and three other jurors smoked marijuana regularly throughout the trial. He also said that he had seen one juror use cocaine five times, and another use it two or three times. One juror sold one-quarter pound (110 g) of marijuana to another juror during the trial, and brought marijuana, cocaine, and drug paraphernalia into the courthouse. Hardy also recalled one juror describing himself as "flying".

== Opinion of the Court ==
The court held that under Federal Rule of Evidence 606(b), the lower courts were correct in denying a hearing on juror misconduct. The court noted that "the near-universal and firmly established common-law rule in the United States flatly prohibited the admission of juror testimony to impeach a jury verdict".

== See also ==
- No-impeachment rule
- Stambovsky v. Ackley
- Mattel, Inc. v. MCA Records, Inc.
