= Peña-Rodriguez v. Colorado =

- Supreme Court of the United States

Argued October 11, 2016 Decided March 6, 2017
- Full case name: Miguel Angel Peña-Rodriguez, Petitioner v. State of Colorado
- Docket no.: 15-606
- Citations: 580 U.S. 206 (more) 137 S. Ct. 855; 197 L. Ed. 2d 107
- Opinion announcement: Opinion announcement

Case history
- Prior: Pena-Rodriguez v. People, 2015 CO 31, 350 P.3d 287; cert. granted, 136 S. Ct. 1513 (2016).

Holding
- The Sixth Amendment requires an exception to the no-impeachment rule when a juror makes a clear statement indicating reliance on racial stereotypes or animus to convict a criminal defendant.

Court membership
- Chief Justice John Roberts Associate Justices Anthony Kennedy · Clarence Thomas; Ruth Bader Ginsburg · Stephen Breyer; Samuel Alito · Sonia Sotomayor; Elena Kagan

Case opinions
- Majority: Kennedy, joined by Ginsburg, Breyer, Sotomayor, Kagan
- Dissent: Thomas
- Dissent: Alito, joined by Roberts, Thomas

Laws applied
- U.S. Const. Amend. VI

Peña-Rodriguez v. Colorado, 580 U.S. 206 (2017), was a United States Supreme Court decision holding that the Sixth Amendment requires a racial bias exception to the no-impeachment rule. According to two jurors, a third juror made a number of biased statements about the defendant's Mexican ethnicity, stating, "I think he did it because he’s Mexican and Mexican men take whatever they want." In a 5–3 vote, the Court held that, notwithstanding a state evidentiary rule, the trial court must be permitted to consider the two jurors' testimony.

== Background ==
The case involved Miguel Angel Peña-Rodriguez, a Colorado man accused of sexually assaulting two teenage girls in a restroom. During jury deliberations, Juror H.C. allegedly made a number of racially biased comments, stating, "Mexican men had a bravado that caused them to believe they could do whatever they wanted with women," and "nine times out of ten Mexican men were guilty of being aggressive toward women and young girls." Juror H.C. also stated that the defendant's alibi witness was not credible because the witness was "an illegal." The jury found Peña-Rodriguez guilty of unlawful sexual contact and harassment, but after the jury was discharged, two jurors, M.M. and L.T., remained to speak with defense counsel in private. Both signed affidavits describing H.C.'s remarks.

On October 11, 2016, oral arguments were heard, where Professor Jeffrey L. Fisher appeared for the accused, the Colorado Solicitor General appeared for that state, and an assistant to the U.S. Solicitor General appeared as amicus curiae in support of the state.

== Opinion of the Court ==
On March 6, 2017, the Supreme Court delivered judgment in favor of the accused, voting 5–3 to reverse and remand to the state court. Justice Anthony Kennedy authored the majority opinion.

== See also ==
- List of United States Supreme Court cases
- List of United States Supreme Court cases, volume 580
