= Implied assertion =

Legalese in evidence law

An implied assertion is a statement or conduct that implies a side issue surrounding certain admissible facts which have not necessarily complied within rules of relevance. There is varying opinion on whether hearsay evidence of implied assertions should be admissible in court to prove or justify the issue within contents. Implied assertions are generally considered less reliable than regular statements, because of how easy it is to fabricate them.

In R vs. Sukadeve Singh [2006] EWCA Crim. 660, [2006] 2 Cr.App.R 12, Rose LJ giving the judgment of the court said this in paragraph 14:

"When section 114 and section 118 of the Criminal Justice Act 2003 are read together they, in our judgment, abolish the common law hearsay rules (save those which are expressly preserved) and create instead a new rule against hearsay which does not extend to implied assertions. What was said by the callers in Kearley would now be admissible as direct evidence of the fact that there was a ready market for the supply of drugs from the premises, from which could be inferred an intention by an occupier to supply drugs. The view of the majority in Kearley, in relation to hearsay, has been set aside by the Act."

As per Sukadeve Singh, various telephone entries are held not to be a matter stated within section 115 but to be implied assertions that are admissible because they were no longer hearsay.
