= Authentication (law) =

Term in evidence law

Authentication, in the law of evidence, is the process by which documentary evidence and other physical evidence is proven to be genuine, and not a forgery. Generally, authentication can be shown in one of two ways. Either a witness can testify as to the chain of custody through which the evidence has passed, from the time of the discovery up until the trial, or, the evidence can be authenticated by the opinion of an expert witness examining the evidence to determine if it has all of the properties that it would be expected to have if it were authentic.

== Types of documents ==
For handwritten documents, any person who has become familiar with the purported author's handwriting prior to the cause of action from which the trial arose can testify that a document is in that handwriting. Alternatively, a handwriting expert can be called to testify based on their expertise in the field and examination of samples that the handwriting on the document is authentic.

Several kinds of documents generally have been deemed to be self-authenticating documents. Under the Federal Rules of Evidence, these include commercial labels, newspapers and other periodicals, and official publications of an arm of the government.

A special category of evidence called an ancient document will be deemed authentic if it can be shown to be more than twenty years old, and found in a place and condition that a document of that age would likely be found.

== Chain of Custody ==
The chain of custody can be used to prove that a document or other evidence is authentic. Documents proving the owner or location of an item until the trial can be used to determine that the evidence is genuine. When the evidence is presented in court, the chain of custody must be presented with it, or the evidence may inadmissible if it is not proven to be authentic by an expert.
