= Operative fact =

An operative fact is a legally relevant fact that establishes a legal relationship between persons.

For example, if a person is the beneficiary of a disability insurance policy, that person becomes entitled to benefits upon becoming disabled. Proof of disability is an operative fact, because it establishes the beneficiary's legal right to receive the insurance benefits.

Any fact that tends to prove or disprove the existence of another fact is classified as an evidential fact. An operative fact may also be an evidential fact, but not necessarily. Similarly, additional evidence may be required before a legal relationship is proved. For example, if one person strikes another person, then that fact may create legal right to recover damages for battery and potentially establishing a legal relationship. That same act could be evidence of the defendant's state of mind.

In litigation, operative and material facts are relevant to a decision of the court. All operative facts are material facts.

The term "operative fact" as a descriptor of the factual premise to a legal conclusion has roots in Hohfeldian legal semiotics.
