= Public policy doctrines for the exclusion of relevant evidence =

In the law of evidence in the United States, public policy doctrines for the exclusion of relevant evidence encompass several types of evidence that would be relevant to prove facts at issue in a legal proceeding, but which are nonetheless excluded because of public policy concerns. There are five major areas of exclusion that arise out of the Federal Rules of Evidence ("FRE"): subsequent remedial measures, ownership of liability insurance, offers to plead guilty to a crime, offers to settle a claim, and offers to pay medical expenses. Many states have modified versions of the FRE under their own state evidence codes which widen or narrow the public policy exclusions in state courts.

The exclusionary rule, under which evidence gathered by the police from an illegal search is excluded, is of similar operation but is typically considered separately.

== Subsequent remedial measures ==
A subsequent remedial measure is an improvement, repair, or safety measure made after an injury has occurred. FRE 407 prohibits the admission of evidence of subsequent remedial measures to show defendant's (1) negligence; (2) culpable conduct; (3) a defect in defendant's product; (4) defect in the design of defendant's product; or (5) the need for a warning or instruction.

Evidence of subsequent remedial measures are generally inadmissible for two reasons. First, courts do not want to discourage defendants from taking steps that further safety. Second, excluding subsequent remedial measures from evidence avoids having to give juries the difficult task of distinguishing between defendant's due care prior to plaintiff's injury, and defendant's due care subsequent to plaintiff's injury.

Subsequent remedial measures are, however, admissible into evidence for

1. witness impeachment purposes
2. proving defendant's ownership of the instrumentality that injured the plaintiff, if ownership is disputed
3. proving defendant's control of the instrumentality that injured the plaintiff, if control is disputed
4. proving the feasibility of undertaking precautionary measures, if feasibility is disputed

Example: In a slip and fall claim where plaintiff falls on the wooden steps leading into a building, defendant decides, as the ambulance is taking plaintiff to the hospital, to quickly sand down the stairs where plaintiff injured herself. FRE 407 prohibits plaintiff from introducing evidence of this subsequent remedial measure to prove that the steps were hazardous at the time of her injury.

If defendant says that he did not own the building where the plaintiff fell, and plaintiff disputes this claim, plaintiff may introduce evidence that the defendant sanded the stairs to show that defendant did, in fact, own the property on which the steps are located at the time her injury occurred.

If defendant claims that there was nothing he could have done to make the steps safer at the time of plaintiff's slip and fall, and plaintiff disputes this allegation, plaintiff may introduce evidence of the subsequent remedial measure to prove that undertaking precautionary measures was, in fact, within their control and feasible to perform.

- Note that in California, California Evidence Code ("CEC") §1151 designates as inadmissible evidence of subsequent remedial measures only if it is being offered to prove (1) negligence or (2) culpable conduct; California state courts, therefore, have abandoned the exclusion of evidence of subsequent remedial measures when being used to prove defects in defendant's product or design of defendant's product, or to prove that there was a need for a warning or instruction.

== Ownership of liability insurance ==
Evidence of a party's ownership of—or lack of ownership of—liability insurance is inadmissible to prove (1) negligence or (2) wrongful conduct because courts do not want to discourage parties from carrying such insurance. FRE 411 states:

Evidence that a person was or was not insured against liability is not admissible upon the issue whether the person acted negligently or otherwise wrongfully. This rule does not require the exclusion of evidence of insurance against liability when offered for another purpose, such as proof of agency, ownership, or control, or bias or prejudice of a witness.

The rule spells out four exceptions to the rule of inadmissibility: evidence of a party's ownership of liability insurance—or of a party's failure to own liability insurance—is admissible to prove (1) a witness' bias or prejudice, i.e. for witness impeachment; (2) agency; (3) ownership; and (4) control.

1. If the owner of the insurance policy disputes ownership or control of the property, for instance, evidence of liability insurance can be introduced to show that it is likely that the owner of the policy probably does own or control the property.
2. If a witness has an interest in the policy that gives the witness a motive or bias with respect to specific testimony, the existence of the policy can be introduced to show this motive or bias. Federal rules of civil procedure rule 26 was amended in 1993 to require that any insurance policy that may pay or may reimburse be made available for photocopying by the opposing litigants, although the policies are not normally information given to the jury. Federal Rules of Appellate Procedure rule 46 says that an appeal can be dismissed or affirmed if counsel does not update their notice of appearance to acknowledge insurance. The Cornell University Legal Institute web site includes congressional notes.

Additionally, an exception arises where the party's mention of its own liability insurance is inextricably intertwined with another statement that is admissible. For example, if after an automobile accident, the driver of one car runs over to the other and says "don't worry, my insurance will pay to fix the damage I caused to your car", the entire statement is admissible not to show that the driver is insured, but that the driver has admitted fault.

- Note that in California, California Evidence Code ("CEC") §1155 provides that evidence of a party's whole or part ownership of liability insurance is inadmissible to prove (1) negligence or (2) other wrongdoing. The statute does not include total lack of ownership of liability insurance, which may thus be used to prove that defendant did not exercise due care.

== Offers to plead guilty to a crime ==
FRE 410 holds that (1) withdrawn guilty pleas; (2) nolo contendere pleas; (3) statements made during proceedings regarding guilty pleas; (4) statements made during proceedings regarding nolo contendere pleas; (5) and statements made during plea discussions with an attorney present are inadmissible for public policy reasons even if they are relevant. The motivation behind excluding such pleas from evidence is to encourage plea bargaining.

Two FRE-contained exceptions apply to this rule: criminal pleas, plea discussions, and related statements are admissible (i) in any proceeding where another statement made in the course of the same plea or plea discussion has been introduced and the statement ought in fairness be considered contemporaneously with it, or (ii) in a criminal proceeding for perjury or false statement if the statement was made by the defendant under oath, on the record, and in the presence of counsel.

Additionally, a criminal defendant may waive inadmissibility protections, rendering criminal pleas, plea discussions, and related statements admissible at trial. It is a common practice for prosecutors drawing up plea deals to include terms requiring the defendant to agree that statements made in the course of plea negotiations may be used to impeach the testimony of that defendant, to protect against the possibility of the defendant later changing her story.

- Note that if a defendant chooses not to withdraw her guilty plea, this is an admission by a party opponent and may be admitted into evidence in subsequent civil proceedings.

== Offers to settle a claim ==
Offers to settle a claim, and related statements made during a settlement conference, are generally inadmissible under FRE 408. The primary public policy motivation is to encourage litigants to settle their disputes. This rule also recognizes that parties may make settlement offers even where they believe they have no actual liability, in order to avoid the expense of litigation. A 2006 amendment to the rule permits the admission of statements made during settlement discussions between a private party and a regulatory body, when those statements are offered as evidence in a criminal case, subject to FRE 403.

The inadmissibility of settlement claims only prohibits the admission of statements, not the admission of facts. Thus, if a party to a settlement conference mentions that she possesses a certain document relevant to the proceedings, the other party may seek to discover that document through legal processes, despite it having first been mentioned in the settlement conference; merely disclosing a document's existence and mentioning it during a settlement conference does not insulate it from being discovered and admitted.

Additionally, the public policy exception of excluding relevant evidence arising out of an offer to settle cannot not apply if the evidence sought to be introduced is a claim made in a period before a dispute between the parties arose.

Example: Florida-based piano teacher P gets her expensive, snow white tile floors polished by North Carolina–based cleaning company C on March 22. C mails P a bill for $100,000 on March 29. P thought that the service would only cost $75,000.00, and disputes the $100,000 charge. Unable to come to a compromise with P, C brings suit on May 8 in federal court to collect $200,000. FRE 408 does not prohibit P's introduction of the $100,000 March bill into evidence as an admission by C that the total amount disputed cannot exceed $100,000.

== Offers to pay medical expenses ==
An offer to pay medical expenses is an offer of this nature made by a party who might potentially be liable for an injury to another is inadmissible despite its relevance. FRE 409 states:

Evidence of furnishing or offering or promising to pay medical, hospital, or similar expenses occasioned by an injury is not admissible to prove liability for the injury.

Evidence of an offer to pay medical expenses is inadmissible for the public policy rationale that courts do not want to discourage parties responsible for injuring others from paying for the treatment of those injuries.

Statements made in connection with offers to pay medical expenses, however, are not excluded by FRE 409.

Example: Plaintiff P slices her lip on a shard of glass that somehow made its way into a salad prepared in defendant D's restaurant. D later visits P in the hospital, puts a bouquet of sunflowers on the table next to the bed where P is sobbing in pain, and exclaims,"I'm so sorry about your injury, it was completely my fault! Please don't worry about your expenses for this hospital visit, I'll write you a check for whatever your bills add up to." In a subsequent personal injury suit brought by P against D in federal court, P may introduce D's statement "I'm so sorry about your injury, it was completely my fault!" as an admission of fault by D.

- Note that in California, California Evidence Code ("CEC") §1152(a) renders both offers to pay medical expenses as well as "statements made in negotiation thereof" inadmissible to prove liability. In the above example, therefore, a CA court would prohibit P's introduction of not only the "Please don't worry about your expenses for this hospital visit, I'll write you a check for whatever your bills add up to" statement, but also the "I'm so sorry about your injury, it was completely my fault" statement.

== Mediation proceedings: a California-specific rule ==
California law excludes from evidence and discovery relevant statements made "for the purpose of, in the course of, or pursuant to, a mediation or a mediation consultation" through California Evidence Code ("CEC") §§1115-1125, for the public policy purpose of encouraging the resolution of legal conflicts by mediation.

== Exclusionary rule ==
The exclusionary rule is another rule under which relevant evidence may be excluded, based in part on public policy concerns. It causes evidence gathered by the police from an illegal search to be inadmissible in a criminal case. The exclusion is intended, in part, to discourage law enforcement officials from violating the search subject's constitutional rights against unreasonable search and seizure. However, it is premised as much on the right of the individual accused against such a search as it is on the larger issue of law enforcement behavior. The rule does also reflect on questions of reliability regarding some (but not all) types of evidence that are excluded thereunder. For example, an officer conducting a warrantless search may have more of an opportunity to plant evidence, and a confession coerced out of a party denied access to legal counsel may be false.

In legal education and discourse, the exclusionary rule is generally treated as a rule of criminal procedure, rather than a rule of evidence.
