= Business records exception =

U.S hearsay rule

The business records exception to the U.S. hearsay rule is based on Rule 803(6) of the Federal Rules of Evidence (FRE). It is sometimes referred to as the business entry rule.

== Rationale ==
The basic rationale for the exception is that employees are under a duty to be accurate in observing, reporting, and recording business facts. The underlying belief is that special reliability is provided by the regularity with which the records are made and kept, as well as the incentive of employees to keep accurate records (under threat of termination or other penalty). The exception functions to allow the record to substitute for the in-court testimony of the employees, but it can only substitute for what the employee could testify about. The availability of the declarant (the employee whose testimony is being replaced by the record) is immaterial for the purposes of this exception.

=== Reliability of the statements in the record ===
It must be apparent to the judge that the record was made in the regular course of business, i.e., that it was customary practice to make such an entry and that the entrant had a duty to record it (either by law or by the terms of his employment). The record must have been made at or near the time of the act, event, or transaction at issue. Furthermore, the record must consist of matters either within the personal knowledge of the entrant or within the personal knowledge of someone with a duty to transmit the information to the entrant.

This last point was contested in the case of Johnson v. Lutz, 253 N.Y. 124, 170 N.E. 517 (1930), which held that a business record is admissible only when it is made by an employee about information, obtained by him, from an informant who himself was under a business duty to impart that information. Johnson dealt specifically with the admissibility of police reports, and set a limitation on the use of such reports in court. Even though the police officer was under a duty to properly record the statements of an informant, the informant himself was under no duty to report the events correctly, and therefore the informant's statement was still inadmissible hearsay.

=== Limitation on admissibility of records prepared for litigation ===
In the case of Palmer v. Hoffman, 318 U.S. 109 (1943), the Supreme Court of the United States ruled that an accident report created by a railroad company which was prepared in anticipation of a lawsuit by the victim was inadmissible, because it was not prepared in the regular course of business. Railroad travel, and not litigation, was the primary business of the railroad, and therefore the report was not considered sufficiently reliable to be admitted into evidence.

== Lack of record as evidence ==
FRE 803(7) states the negative counterpart of the business records exception: the use of the lack of a record to prove that a transaction or occurrence had not taken place, if it was the regular practice of the business to record such events if they had actually occurred.

== Other types of business records ==
Under FRE 803(17), market reports and quotations, directories, and other published compilations are considered generally admissible if they are generally used and relied upon by the public or by persons in particular occupations. Such information is considered admissible separate and apart from privately made business records described above.

== See also ==
- Third-party doctrine, on Fourth Amendment protection for business records
