= Ancient document =

Means of authentication for a piece of documentary evidence

An ancient document, in the law of evidence, refers to both a means of authentication for a piece of documentary evidence, and an exception to the hearsay rule.

== Authentication ==
With respect to authentication, an "ancient document" is one that may be deemed authentic without a witness to attest to the circumstances of its creation because its age suggests that it is unlikely to have been falsified in anticipation of the litigation in which it is introduced.

Under the American Federal Rules of Evidence ("FRE"), a document is deemed authentic if it is:

1. at least twenty years old;
2. in a condition that makes it free from suspicion concerning its authenticity; and
3. found in a place where such a writing was likely to be kept.

Many states have similar rules, but may limit the application of the doctrine to specific kinds of documents such as dispositive instruments (primarily conveyances, deeds, and wills), and may require the documents to be even older.

By admitting an ancient document into evidence, it is presumed only that the document is what it purports to be, but there are no presumptions about the truth of the document's contents. A jury can still decide that the author of the document was lying or mistaken when the author wrote it.

== Hearsay ==
Ancient documents also present an exception to the hearsay rule. FRE 803(16) applies this exception to all documents prepared before January 1, 1998. Because of their age, they may be presented as evidence of the truth of any statements contained therein. Many states follow this rule as well, but again most limit it to documents that dispose of property.
