= Res gestae =

Start-to-end period of a felony

Res gestae (Latin for 'things done') is a term found in substantive and procedural American jurisprudence and English law. In American substantive law, it refers to the period of a felony from start-to-end. In American procedural law, it refers to a former exception to the hearsay rule for statements made spontaneously or as part of an act. The English and Canadian version of res gestae is similar, but is still recognized as a traditional exception to the hearsay rule.

== Res gestae in American substantive law ==
In certain felony murder statutes, res gestae is a term defining the overall start-to-end sequence of the underlying felony. Generally, a felony's res gestae is considered terminated when the suspect has achieved a position of relative safety from law enforcement.

== Res gestae in American hearsay law ==
Under the Federal Rules of Evidence, res gestae may formerly have been, but is no longer, an exception to the rule against hearsay evidence based on the belief that, because certain statements are made naturally, spontaneously, and without deliberation during the course of an event, they leave little room for misunderstanding or misinterpretation upon hearing by someone else (e.g., by the witness, who will later repeat the statement to the court), and thus the courts believe that such statements carry a high degree of credibility. Statements that could be admitted into evidence as res gestae fall into three headings:

1. Words or phrases that either form part of, or explain, a physical act;
2. Exclamations that are so spontaneous as to belie concoction; and
3. Statements that are evidence of someone's state of mind.

The present sense impression, excited utterance, and then-existing mental, emotional, or physical condition hearsay exceptions, respective to the above headings, now cover many situations under the Federal Rules of Evidence that would formerly have been considered res gestae.

In some jurisdictions, the res gestae exception has also been used to admit police sketches.

The following scenario is an example of types 1 and 2: Imagine a young woman (the witness) standing on the side of a main road. She sees some commotion across the street. On the opposite side of the road to her, she sees an old man and hears him shout, "The bank is being robbed!", as a young man runs out of a building and away down the street. The old man is never found (and so cannot appear in court to repeat what he said), but the woman repeats what she heard him say. Such a statement would be considered trustworthy for the purpose of admission as evidence because the statement was made concurrently with the event, and there is little chance that the witness repeating the hearsay could have misunderstood its meaning or the speaker's intentions.

== Res gestae in American propensity evidence law ==
Under the Federal Rules of Evidence, res gestae may also be used to demonstrate that certain character evidence, otherwise excludable under the provisions of Rule 404, is permissible, as the events in question are part of the "ongoing narrative", or sequence of events that are necessary to define the action at hand.

== Res gestae in English hearsay law ==
The common law res gestae exception has been preserved under the statutory hearsay regime in s118(4) of the Criminal Justice Act 2003.

Any rule of law under which in criminal proceedings a statement is admissible as evidence of any matter stated if—

(a) the statement was made by a person so emotionally overpowered by an event that the possibility of concoction or distortion can be disregarded,

(b) the statement accompanied an act which can be properly evaluated as evidence only if considered in conjunction with the statement, or

(c) the statement relates to a physical sensation or a mental state (such as intention or emotion).

Categories (a) and (c) are the most commonly used. The American formulation of "excited utterances" is broadly akin to the English category of "emotionally overpowering".

When considering whether to admit hearsay evidence through the res gestae, case law strongly advises judges to consider whether "the possibility of concoction or distortion [can] be disregarded".

There has been significant criticism of the exception by judges and legal academics. In 1997, the Law Commission argued that the primary use of it was to allow evidence from unavailable witnesses (including those who were deceased or in fear of testifying)—their proposal for a hearsay exception for this specific reason became section 116 of the Criminal Justice Act 2003. Given the existence of this, "it is difficult to see what useful purpose was served by retaining this group of exceptions to the hearsay rule, because they add little if anything to what is already provided by section 116" argues Professor JR Spencer.

== Other uses ==
- Res gestae is also used to refer to those facts or things done which form the basis or gravamen for a legal action.
- Res gestae is also used in the context of the doctrine of respondeat superior, or the law of vicarious liability. Particularly, res gestae refers to time, place, and in the interest of an employer.
- Res Gestae is a publication of the Indiana State Bar Association.
- Res Gestae is R.G. Collingwood's term for the world of human affairs (as separated from the natural world) in his The Idea Of History (1946), which deals with the philosophy of history.
