= Present sense impression =

Exception to prohibition on use of hearsay evidence

A present sense impression, in the law of evidence, is a statement made by a person (the declarant) that conveys their sense of the state of an event or the condition of something. The statement must be spontaneously made while the person was perceiving (i.e. contemporaneous with) the event or condition, or "immediately thereafter." The permissible time lapse between event and statement may range from seconds to minutes, but probably not hours. The subject matter and content of the statement are limited to descriptions or explanations of the event or condition, therefore opinions, inferences, or conclusions about the event or condition are not present sense impressions. An example of present sense impression is of a person saying, "it's cold" or "we're going really fast".

Under the Federal Rules of Evidence [FRE 803(1)], a statement of present sense impression is an exception to the prohibition on use of hearsay as evidence at a trial or hearing, and is therefore admissible to prove the truth of the statement itself (i.e. to prove that it was in fact cold at the time the person was speaking, or to prove that the person was indeed traveling very fast). The basis for this exception is the belief that the statement is likely reliable and true, as there is no time for reflection, distortion, or fabrication.

The witness testifying about the statement need not be the declarant who, with firsthand knowledge about the event and condition, would normally make a better witness. The witness must have personal knowledge of declarant's making of the statement, but need not have personal knowledge of the event or the content of the statement. For example, a policeman observed from a distance that a reporter was dictating into a voice-recorder while a shooting was going on, but could not hear what the reporter was dictating. The reporter is unavailable to testify. The policeman testifies that he saw the reporter make the dictation. Upon proper authentication, that portion of the audio-recording containing descriptions or explanations of the shooting is admissible as present sense impression.
