= Hearsay =

Legal term

Hearsay, in a legal forum, is an out-of-court statement which is being offered in court for the truth of what was asserted. In most courts, hearsay evidence is inadmissible (the "hearsay evidence rule") unless an exception to the hearsay rule applies.

For example, to prove that Tom was in town, a witness testifies, "Susan told me that Tom was in town." Because the witness's evidence relies on an out-of-court statement that Susan made, if Susan is unavailable for cross-examination, the answer is hearsay. A justification for the objection is that the person who made the statement is not in court and thus not available for cross-examination. Note, however, that if the matter at hand is not the truth of the assertion about Tom being in town but the fact that Susan said the specific words, it may be acceptable. For example, it would be acceptable to ask a witness what Susan told them about Tom in a defamation case against Susan. Now the witness is asked about the opposing party's statement that constitutes a verbal act.

In one example, testimony that a plaintiff stated "I am Napoleon Bonaparte" would be hearsay as proof that the plaintiff is Napoleon, but would not be hearsay as proof that the plaintiff asserted that they are Napoleon. (A judge or jury would then be left to judge the significance of the statement, including how to interpret it, what to infer [or not] from it, etc.)

The hearsay rule does not exclude the evidence if it is an operative fact. Language of commercial offer and acceptance is also admissible over a hearsay exception because the statements have independent legal significance.

Double hearsay is a hearsay statement that contains another hearsay statement itself. Each layer of hearsay must be found separately as admissible for the statement to be admitted in court.

Many jurisdictions that generally disallow hearsay evidence in courts permit the more widespread use of hearsay in non-judicial hearings.

== United States ==
"Hearsay is a statement, other than one made by the declarant while testifying at the trial or hearing, offered in evidence to prove the truth of the matter asserted." Per Federal Rule of Evidence 801(d)(2)(a), a statement made by a defendant is admissible as evidence only if it is inculpatory; exculpatory statements made to an investigator are hearsay and therefore may not be admitted as evidence in court, unless the defendant testifies. When an out-of-court statement offered as evidence contains another out-of-court statement it is called double hearsay, and both layers of hearsay must be found separately admissible.

There are several exceptions to the rule against hearsay in U.S. law. Federal Rule of Evidence 803 lists the following:

- Present sense impressions and excited utterances
- Then existing mental, emotional, or physical condition
- Statements for purposes of medical diagnosis or treatment
- Recorded recollection
- Records of regularly conducted activity, including absence of entry in records
- Public records and reports, including absence of entry in records
- Records or births, fetal deaths, deaths and marriages made pursuant to law
- Records of religious organisations of facts of personal or family history, contained in a regularly kept record
- Marriage, baptismal, and similar certificates
- Family records
- Statements in documents affecting an interest in property
- Statements in ancient documents
- Market reports, commercial publications
- Learned treatises
- Reputation concerning personal or family history, boundaries, or general history, or as to character
- Judgment of previous conviction
- Judgment as to personal, family, or general history, or boundaries.

Rule 804 adds several additional exceptions where the declarant is unavailable:

- Former testimony
- Statement under belief of impending death in homicide or civil actions
- Statement against interest
- Statement of personal or family history
- Forfeiture by wrongdoing

Though a hearsay statement may be admissible through an exception, the Sixth Amendment to the United States Constitution provides a specific constitutional protection for criminal defendants. The Sixth Amendment provides that "In all criminal prosecutions, the accused shall enjoy the right ... to be confronted with the witnesses against him". If the trial court determines that the Confrontation Clause has been validated, then the hearsay evidence will not be admitted.

Also, some documents are self-authenticating under Rule 902, such as domestic public documents under seal, domestic public documents not under seal, but bearing a signature of a public officer, foreign public documents, certified copies of public records, official publications, newspapers and periodicals, trade inscriptions and the like, acknowledged documents (i.e. by a notary public), commercial paper and related documents, presumptions under Acts of Congress, certified domestic records of regularly conducted activity, and certified foreign records of regularly conducted activity.

== England and Wales ==
In England and Wales, hearsay is generally admissible in civil proceedings, but is only admissible in criminal proceedings if it falls within a statutory or preserved common law exception, all of the parties to the proceedings agree, or the court is satisfied that it is in the interests of justice that the evidence is admissible.

Section 116 of the Criminal Justice Act 2003 provides that, where a witness is unavailable, hearsay is admissible where

- the relevant person is dead;
- the relevant person is unfit to be a witness because of his bodily or mental condition;
- the relevant person is outside the UK and it is not reasonably practicable to secure his attendance;
- the relevant person cannot be found;
- through fear, the relevant person does not give oral evidence in the proceedings and the court gives leave for the statement to be given in evidence.

The two main common law exceptions to the rule that hearsay is inadmissible are res gestae and confessions.

== Canada ==
Hearsay evidence is generally inadmissible in Canada unless it falls within one of the established common law exceptions. As a result of the Supreme Court's decision in R. v. Khan and subsequent cases, hearsay evidence that does not fall within the established exceptions can be admitted where established that such evidence is both "necessary and reliable". Additionally, hearsay evidence that would otherwise be admissible as an exception can nonetheless be excluded if it is not necessary and reliable, as in R. v. Starr.

== Australia ==
The rules of evidence differ among the states and the Commonwealth; the Commonwealth, Victoria, New South Wales, Tasmania, and the Australian Capital Territory all share similar hearsay provisions in their Uniform Evidence Acts; the other states rely upon the common law. As elsewhere, hearsay is usually inadmissible, outside of interlocutory proceedings, unless it falls within one of the hearsay exceptions.

=== Uniform Evidence Act ===
Hearsay is dealt with under Part 3·2. There are several local peculiarities with its treatment. s 59 defines the "fact" of a hearsay statement as being something "that it can reasonably be supposed that the person intended to assert by the representation". Hearsay rule confines the potentially broad number of assertions it might cover by this broad definition of representation to only intended representations adduced to prove existence of the asserted facts. In Lee v The Queen, the term representation was used to apply to statements and to conduct and was used to encompass all those statements or that conduct would convey to the observer.

The extraordinary s 60 allows a statement's use as hearsay if it is admitted for a non-hearsay purpose, although the application of s 60 may be limited by s 137 (which is essentially the discretion formerly known as Christie). S 72 excepts "evidence of a representation about ... the traditional laws and customs of an Aboriginal or Torres Strait Islander group", although this arguably would have fallen into the "public right" exception at common law. Confessions are called "admissions" by the act (which led to the confusion whereby counsel apply for the "admission of the admission"). They are dealt with separately under Part 3·4, which lifts the hearsay rule. The act's dictionary defines admission broadly enough to include anything that might be used against the accused. The other sections in the part for the most part codify, roughly, the common-law rules.

== Malaysia ==
In Malaysia, hearsay evidence is generally not allowed. However, the Evidence Act 1950 permitted a few exceptions, such as section 60, 73A, 73AA etc.

== New Zealand ==
Hearsay evidence is covered by sections 16-22 of the Evidence Act 2006. Previously inadmissible, the 1989 decision of the Court of Appeal in R v Baker created a common law exception to the hearsay rule based on reliability, which was codified in the Evidence Act. Pursuant to s 4(1) of the act, a hearsay statement is a statement made by someone other than a witness (in the proceedings) that is offered to prove the truth of its contents. Under section 17 of this act a hearsay statement is generally not admissible in any court proceeding. Though section 18 states when a hearsay statement may be able to be given in court. This is when the statement is reliable, the statement maker is unavailable to be called as a witness or it would provide undue expense and delay if that person was required to be a witness. There are also a number of specific exceptions such as statements in business records. Other exceptions include state of mind evidence (see R v Blastland) and whether the statement is tendered to prove the fact it was uttered or made, rather than to prove the truth of its contents (see DPP v Subramaniam).

== Sri Lanka ==
In Sri Lanka, hearsay evidence is generally not allowed. However, the Evidence Ordinance recognizes a few exceptions such as res gestae (recognised under Section 6) and common intention (recognised under Section 10)and some other exceptions from section 17 to section 39. Some other exceptions are provided by case law (see Subramaniam v. DPP [1956] 1 WLR 956 (PC)).

== Sweden ==
Sweden allows hearsay evidence. Sweden applies a principle of admissibility of evidence which means that there are very few restrictions on what evidence is allowed in court. It is then up to the court to evaluate the reliability of the evidence presented.

== Hong Kong ==
In Hong Kong, hearsay is generally admissible in civil proceedings under the statutory regime. Section 46 of the Evidence Ordinance provides that evidence shall not be excluded on the ground that it is hearsay in civil proceedings unless: the party against whom the evidence is to be adduced objects to the admission of the evidence; as well as: the court is satisfied, having regard to the circumstances of the case, that the exclusion of the evidence is not prejudicial to the interests of justice. Sections 47A to 51 provides for safeguards in relation to hearsay evidence admissible under section 46 so as to avoid abuses of the general admission:

- the obligation to give notice and particulars to other parties when proposing to adduce hearsay evidence (Section 47A);
- the power to call witness for cross-examination on hearsay statement with the leave of the court (Section 48);
- consideration relevant to weighing of hearsay evidence (Section 49);
- competence and credibility (Section 50);
- previous statement of witness (Section 51).

The courts shall draw inferences from the circumstances as to the weight attached to hearsay evidence, in particular:

- whether it would have been reasonable and practicable for the party by whom the evidence was adduced to have produced the maker of the original statement as a witness;
- whether the original statement was made contemporaneously with the occurrence or existence of the matters stated;
- whether the evidence involves multiple hearsay;
- whether any person involved had any motive to conceal or misrepresent matters;
- whether the original statement was an edited account, or was made in collaboration with another or for a particular purpose;
- whether the circumstances in which the evidence is adduced as hearsay are such as to suggest an attempt to prevent proper evaluation of its weight;
- whether or not the evidence adduced by the party is consistent with any evidence previously adduced by the party.

The new civil regime also preserves a number of common law exceptions that are unaffected by the statutory safeguards except for the section 47A safeguard relating to notice. In criminal proceedings, the law relating to hearsay has not been substantially changed in Hong Kong, and the common law regime remains the rules followed by the Hong Kong criminal courts. Hearsay evidence is inadmissible in all criminal cases except for common law and statutory exemptions, which include: admissions and confessions, dying declarations, declarations in the course of duty, declarations against interest, co-conspirator's rule, statements in public documents, out-of-court statements, evidence in former proceedings, and res gestae.

Statutory exceptions in criminal cases include: negative assertions (s.17A Evidence Ordinance), bank records (ss.19B and 20 Evidence Ordinance), documentary records compiled by a person under a duty (s.22 Evidence Ordinance), computer records (s.22A Evidence Ordinance), and agreed written statements (s.65B Criminal Procedure Ordinance).

== See also ==
- Gossip
- Heresy
- List of objections (law)
- Moral certainty
- Probable cause
- Reasonable person
- Reasonable suspicion
- Scuttlebutt
