= Self-authenticating document =

A self-authenticating document, under the law of evidence in the United States, is any document that can be admitted into evidence at a trial without proof being submitted to support the claim that the document is what it appears to be. Several categories of documents are deemed to be self-authenticating:

1. Certified copy of public or business records;
2. Official publications of government agencies;
3. Newspaper articles;
4. Trade inscriptions, such as labels on products;
5. Acknowledged documents (wherein the signer also gets a paper notarized); and
6. Commercial paper under the Uniform Commercial Code.

Although most U.S. states have evidentiary rules similar to the Federal Rules of Evidence, the California Evidence Code diverges significantly from the FRE in that it does not treat trade inscriptions as self-authenticating. However, this divergence is not as significant as it may first appear, because California also allows for the admissibility of secondary evidence of documents and the nonhearsay use of evidence of trade inscriptions as circumstantial evidence of identity.
