= Dead Man's Statute =

A dead man's statute, also known as a dead man act or dead man's rule, is a statute designed to prevent perjury in a civil case by prohibiting a witness who is an interested party from testifying about communications or transactions with a deceased person (a "decedent") against the decedent unless there is a waiver.

This prohibition applies only against a witness who has an interest in the outcome of the case and applies only where that witness is testifying for his own interests and against the interests of the decedent. Furthermore, the restriction only exists in civil cases, never in criminal cases.

The restriction can be waived. A waiver can occur in a number of ways:

1. The decedent's representative fails to object to the testimony;
2. The decedent's own representative testifies to the communication;
3. The decedent's testimony is brought before the jury in the form of a deposition or in another form.

With respect to U.S. federal courts, Rule 601 of the Federal Rules of Evidence defers to state law the determination of whether a witness is competent to testify.

About half of the U.S. States have enacted a dead man statute, more commonly referred to as the "dead man's rule." Some states have enacted compromise variations to the rule. For example, in Virginia, an interested witness may testify only as to the statements of the deceased if this testimony is corroborated by a disinterested witness. In other states, such as Illinois, the rule has been expanded to prevent an interested party from testifying about communications with a minor or a legally incompetent person.

The Texas dead man's rule, found at Texas Rules of Evidence, 601(b) reads: (b) "Dead Man Rule" in Civil Actions. In civil actions by or against executors, administrators, or guardians, in which judgment may be rendered for or against them as such, neither party shall be allowed to testify against the others as to any oral statement by the testator, intestate or ward, unless that testimony to the oral statement is corroborated or unless the witness is called at the trial to testify thereto by the opposite party; and, the provisions of this article shall extend to and include all actions by or against the heirs or legal representatives of a decedent based in whole or in part on such oral statement. Except for the foregoing, a witness is not precluded from giving evidence of or concerning any transaction with, any conversations with, any admissions of, or statement by, a deceased or insane party or person merely because the witness is a party to the action or a person interested in the event thereof. The trial court shall, in a proper case, where this rule prohibits an interested party or witness from testifying, instruct the jury that such person is not permitted by the law to give evidence relating to any oral statement by the deceased or ward unless the oral statement is corroborated or unless the party or witness is called at the trial by the opposite party.
