= Relevance (law) =

Tendency of an item of evidence to prove/disprove one of the legal elements of a case

Relevance, in the common law of evidence, is the tendency of a given item of evidence to prove or disprove one of the legal elements of the case, or to have probative value to make one of the elements of the case likelier or not. Probative is a term used in law to signify "tending to prove". Probative evidence "seeks the truth". Generally in law, evidence that is not probative (doesn't tend to prove the proposition for which it is proffered) is inadmissible and the rules of evidence permit it to be excluded from a proceeding or stricken from the record "if objected to by opposing counsel". A balancing test may come into the picture if the value of the evidence needs to be weighed versus its prejudicial nature.

== Under the Federal Rules of Evidence (United States) ==
Until the Federal Rules of Evidence were restyled in 2011, Rule 401 defined relevance as follows:

"Relevant evidence" means evidence having any tendency to make the existence of any fact that is of consequence to the determination of the action more probable or less probable than it would be without the evidence.

This definition incorporates the requirement that evidence be both material ("of consequence to the determination of the action") and have probative value ("having any tendency to make the existence of any [material] fact...more probable or less probable than it would be without the evidence"). The restyled Rule 401, however, separates these traditional concepts in order to make the rule clearer and more easily understood. The amended language essentially rewrites the rule as a test, rather than a definition, for relevance:

Evidence is relevant if:

(a) it has any tendency to make a fact more or less probable than it would be without the evidence; and
(b) the fact is of consequence in determining the action.

=== Evidence and the matter properly provable ===
According to the notes of the Advisory Committee appointed to draft the Federal Rules of Evidence,

Relevancy is not an inherent characteristic of any item of evidence but exists only as a relation between an item of evidence and a matter properly provable in the case.

The United States Court of Appeals for the District of Columbia Circuit explains the concept of "matter properly provable" as follows:

The initial step in determining relevancy is therefore to identify the "matter properly provable." As Professor James explained in a highly-regarded article, '[t]o discover the relevancy of an offered item of evidence one must first discover to what proposition it is supposed to be relevant."

=== Relevance and admissibility ===
While all evidence must have probative value to be admitted, not all evidence with probative value is admisible. However, relevant evidence is not admissible if prohibited by the Constitution, an Act of Congress, by the Federal Rules of Evidence, or by rules prescribed by the Supreme Court. Under the Federal Rules of Evidence, relevant evidence may be excluded on the basis of enumerated grounds.

For example, relevant evidence may be excluded if its probative value (its ability to prove or disprove a fact) is heavily outweighed by its prejudicial value (its ability to bias or confuse the jury). Under Rule 403 of the Federal Rules of Evidence, relevant evidence may be excluded if its probative value is substantially outweighed by its prejudicial value. The grounds for exclusion are:

- unfair prejudice
- confusing the issues or misleading the jury
- undue delay, wasting time, or needlessly presenting cumulative evidence

An example of inadmissible evidence is that the prosecution generally cannot present character evidence, such as old convictions for unrelated crimes. Courts have ruled that while past criminal behavior may have probative value (because it increases the probability of future criminal behavior) such evidence is too prejudicial to be allowed, as juries could convict defendants to punish them for past crimes.

=== Preservation of the issue ===
To preserve legal error for review, objections must be raised. Often objections against the introduction of evidence are made on the basis of relevance. However, the rules and opinions demonstrate that relevant evidence includes a significant portion of typically offered evidence. Since objections are required to be specific and timely, merely objecting on the basis of relevance, without more, may prevent the review of legal error on appeal. More particularly, making an objection based on “relevance” does not preserve an error based on Rule 403. Cases that lack specific and timely objections are sometimes referred to as having "poor records" because errors made by the lower court may not be reviewed on appeal.

=== Public policy concerns ===
A variety of social policies operate to exclude relevant evidence. Thus, there are limitations on the use of evidence of liability insurance, subsequent remedial measures, settlement offers, and plea negotiations, mainly because it is thought that the use of such evidence discourages parties from carrying insurance, fixing hazardous conditions, offering to settle, and pleading guilty to crimes, respectively.

== Canada ==
The Canadian judiciary system uses the term "probative", which also signifies "prove to be worthy".

=== History of legal doctrine ===
In 1970, the Supreme Court of Canada was concerned with exclusionary discretion within the judicial system. In R. v. Wray, the term "probative value" is used to explain that "judges in criminal cases do not have a discretion to exclude evidence because of how it was obtained."

"The trial judge's discretion to exclude admissible evidence does not extend beyond his duty to ensure that the minds of the jury will not be prejudiced by evidence of little probative value, but of great prejudicial effect. Exclusion of evidence on the ground that, although its probative value was unquestionable, it was obtained by methods which the judge considers to be unfair, has nothing to do with his duty to secure a fair trial for the accused."

—

The sole discretion to exclude evidence is based on the weighing of prejudicial value and probative value. Where the material evidence is being considered for exclusion:

"...a judge must determine the value of the evidence based on reliability and the strength of the inference it led to, against the cost presented by such evidence, including things as diverse as the practicalities of its presentation, the fairness to the parties and to witnesses, and the potentially distorting effect the evidence can have on the outcome of the case."

—

== Australia ==
Australian rule of evidence is a mixture of statute and common law, together with the rules of court. It has a uniform Evidence Act (UEA or the "Act") that consists of Acts of the Commonwealth, New South Wales, Victoria, Tasmania, the Australian Capital Territory, and the Northern Territory. This therefore applies in most, but not all, states and territories of Australia. The rules of evidence work to ensure that criminal trials are conducted in a manner that is fair to both parties in the proceedings, with distinct focus on testing of evidence.

=== Relevance and admissibility ===
As per Barwick CJ in Wilson, "The fundamental rule governing the admissibility of evidence is that it be relevant. In every instance the proffered evidence must ultimately be brought to that touchstone."

The scheme of Chapter 3 of the Act deals with admissibility of evidence. Evidence which is relevant is generally admissible, and evidence which is irrelevant is inadmissible. Evidence is relevant if it is evidence which, if accepted, could rationally affect (directly or indirectly) the assessment of the probability of a fact in issue in the proceedings. Since evidence that is relevant has the capability to affect the assessment of the probability of the existence of a fact in issue, it is "probative". This determination is known as logical relevance. Logical relevance merely requires evidence have a logical connection to the facts in issue. But neither s 55 nor s 56 of the Act requires that evidence be probative to a particular degree for it to be admissible. Evidence that is of only some, even slight, probative value will be admissible, just as it is at common law. Therefore, evidence is either relevant or it is not and if the evidence is not relevant then no further question arises about its admissibility. However, logical relevance isn't sufficient to establish the potential admissibility of the evidence and is still possible for the evidence to be inadmissible. This determination is known as "legal relevance" as opposed to logical relevance and sets a demanding test for discretionary exclusion (but one that is not obligatory) where its probative value is substantially outweighed by the danger that the evidence might be unfairly prejudicial. Once the legal relevance of the evidence is established, the exclusionary principles and exceptions to those principles are also to be considered.

=== Tendency and coincidence evidence ===
The definitions of these types of evidence and how they may be used differ slightly among some of the states. Under Victoria's Evidence Act 2008:

- Tendency evidence is evidence that allows the jury to reason that the accused had committed the crime before, has a propensity to do such a thing, and that it is likely that they did it again on the occasion in question.
- Coincidence evidence is evidence using the unlikelihood of two or more events occurring coincidentally in order to prove that a person did a particular act.

Judges have to determine whether these types of evidence, based on how the parties are looking to use the evidence; this determines which admissibility test applies, and what directions to give to the jury.

John Stratton, NSW Deputy Senior Public Defender, opined at a 2008 legal conference that there was no clear dividing line between the two, although some cases had determined precedents for use. He thought that "the tendency and the coincidence principles should be regarded as alternative and overlapping avenues by which material may be introduced into evidence".

=== Relevance and reliability ===
Reliability considers the probative force of the evidence (the legal relevance), rather than the evidence's ability to affect the probability of the existence of a fact in issue (the logical relevance).

== See also ==
- Evidence
- Prejudice (legal procedure)
