= Evidence (law) =

Body of facts in a legal proceeding

The law of evidence, also known as the rules of evidence, encompasses the rules and legal principles that govern the proof of facts in a legal proceeding. These rules determine what evidence must or must not be considered by the trier of fact in reaching its decision. The trier of fact is a judge in bench trials, or the jury in any cases involving a jury. The law of evidence is also concerned with the quantum (amount), quality, and type of proof needed to prevail in litigation. The rules vary depending upon whether the venue is a criminal court, civil court, or family court, and they vary by jurisdiction.

The quantum of evidence is the amount of evidence needed; the quality of proof is how reliable such evidence should be considered. Important rules that govern admissibility concern hearsay, authentication, relevance, privilege, witnesses, opinions, expert testimony, identification and rules of physical evidence. There are various standards of evidence, standards showing how strong the evidence must be to meet the legal burden of proof in a given situation, ranging from reasonable suspicion to preponderance of the evidence, clear and convincing evidence, or beyond a reasonable doubt.

There are several types of evidence, which vary from one another in form or source.

Evidence governs the use of testimony (e.g., oral or written statements, such as an affidavit), exhibits (e.g., physical objects), documentary material, or demonstrative evidence, which are admissible (i.e., allowed to be considered by the trier of fact, such as jury) in a judicial or administrative proceeding (e.g., a court of law).

When a dispute, whether relating to a civil or criminal matter, reaches the court there will always be a number of issues which one party will have to prove in order to persuade the court to find in their favour. The law must ensure certain guidelines are set out in order to ensure that evidence presented to the court can be regarded as trustworthy.

== History ==
=== Ancient and medieval law ===
Hammurabi's Code had some evidence requiring an oath and witness. See specifically laws 10, 11, and 12.

The Old Testament demanded at least two witnesses for conviction of a crime.

Ancient Roman law allowed freedom to judges to evaluate evidence, but insisted that "proof is incumbent on the party who affirms a fact, not on him who denies it" and "no-one should be convicted on suspicion". Medieval Roman law developed an elaborate grading of degrees of evidence. Building on the Biblical two-witness rule, it concluded that a single witness, or private documents, could constitute half-proof, which though insufficient for conviction might justify torture to extract further evidence. Because evidence in the continental (civil law) system was evaluated by judges rather than juries, that system did not develop exclusionary rules of evidence in the way English law did.

=== Anglophone (Common) law ===
A distinct feature of English common law historically was the role of the jury as a finder of fact, as opposed to the role of the judge as finder of law. The creation of modern jury trials in the 16th and 17th centuries necessitated rules of evidence to regulate what testimony and other evidence could be put before the jury. While much of the early common law evidence rules came from judicial decisions, the English Parliament also played a role. In 1677, Parliament and the Crown enacted the Statute of Frauds and Perjuries, prohibiting plaintiffs from alleging certain contractual breaches to the jury unless accompanied by a signed, written instrument. Another early evidence rule was the prohibition on hearsay, the admission of an out-of-court statement to prove the truth of what is asserted. In the early 19th Century, Chief Justice Lord Mansfield of the Court of Common Pleas stated:

"In Scotland and most of the continental states, the judges determine upon the facts in dispute as well as upon the law; and they think there is no danger in their listening to evidence of hearsay, because, when they come to consider their judgment on the merits of the case, they can trust themselves entirely to disregard the hearsay evidence, or to give it any little weight which it may seem to deserve. But in England, where the jury are the sole judges of the fact, hearsay evidence is properly excluded, because no man can tell what effect it might have upon their minds."

Hearsay rules have subsequently been updated numerous times. Most recently in England and Wales, the Civil Evidence Act 1995, section 1, specifically allows for admission of 'hearsay' evidence; legislation also allows for 'hearsay' evidence to be used in criminal proceedings, which makes it possible for the accuser to induce friends or family to give false evidence in support of their accusations because, normally, it would be rejected by the presiding authority or judge. There are several examples where presiding authorities are not bound by the rules of evidence. These include the military tribunals in the United States and tribunals used in Australia to try health professionals.

== Relevance and social policy ==
In every jurisdiction based on the English common law tradition, evidence must conform to a number of rules and restrictions to be admissible. Evidence must be relevant, i.e. it must be directed at proving or disproving a legal element.

However, the relevance of evidence is ordinarily a necessary condition but not a sufficient condition for the admissibility of evidence. For example, relevant evidence may be excluded if it is unfairly prejudicial, confusing, or the relevance or irrelevance of evidence cannot be determined by logical analysis. There is also general agreement that assessment of relevance or irrelevance involves or requires judgements about probabilities or uncertainties. Beyond that, there is little agreement. Many legal scholars and judges agree that ordinary reasoning, or common sense reasoning, plays an important role. There is less agreement about whether or not judgements of relevance or irrelevance are defensible only if the reasoning that supports such judgements is made fully explicit. However, most trial judges would reject any such requirement and would say that some judgements can and must rest partly on unarticulated and unarticulable hunches and intuitions. However, there is general (though implicit) agreement that the relevance of at least some types of expert evidence—particularly evidence from the hard sciences—requires particularly rigorous, or in any event more arcane reasoning than is usually needed or expected. There is a general agreement that judgments of relevance are largely within the discretion of the trial court –although relevance rulings that lead to the exclusion of evidence are more likely to be reversed on appeal than are relevance rulings that lead to the admission of evidence.

According to Rule 401 of the Federal Rules of Evidence (FRE), evidence is relevant if it has the "tendency to make the existence of any fact that is of consequence to the determination of the action more probable or less probable than it would be without the evidence."

Federal Rule 403 allows relevant evidence to be excluded "if its probative value is substantially outweighed by the danger of unfair prejudice", if it leads to confusion of the issues, if it is misleading or if it is a waste of time. California Evidence Code section 352 also allows for exclusion to avoid "substantial danger of undue prejudice." For example, evidence that the victim of a car accident was apparently a "liar, cheater, womanizer, and a man of low morals" was unduly prejudicial and irrelevant to whether he had a valid product liability claim against the manufacturer of the tires on his van (which had rolled over resulting in severe brain damage).

== Presence or absence of a jury ==
The United States has a very complicated system of evidentiary rules; for example, John Wigmore's celebrated treatise on it filled ten volumes. James Bradley Thayer reported in 1898 that even English lawyers were surprised by the complexity of American evidence law, such as its reliance on exceptions to preserve evidentiary objections for appeal.

Some legal experts, notably Stanford legal historian Lawrence Friedman, have argued that the complexity of American evidence law arises from two factors: (1) the right of American defendants to have findings of fact made by a jury in practically all criminal cases as well as many civil cases; and (2) the widespread consensus that tight limitations on the admissibility of evidence are necessary to prevent a jury of untrained laypersons from being swayed by irrelevant distractions. In Professor Friedman's words: "A trained judge would not need all these rules; and indeed, the law of evidence in systems that lack a jury is short, sweet, and clear." However, Friedman's views are characteristic of an earlier generation of legal scholars. The majority of people now reject the formerly-popular proposition that the institution of trial by jury is the main reason for the existence of rules of evidence even in countries such as the United States and Australia; they argue that other variables are at work.

== Exclusion of evidence ==
=== Unfairness ===
Under English law, evidence that would otherwise be admissible at trial may be excluded at the discretion of the trial judge if it would be unfair to the defendant to admit it.

Evidence of a confession may be excluded because it was obtained by oppression or because the confession was made in consequence of anything said or done to the defendant that would be likely to make the confession unreliable. In these circumstances, it would be open to the trial judge to exclude the evidence of the confession under Section 78(1) of the Police and Criminal Evidence Act 1984 (PACE), or under Section 73 PACE, or under common law, although in practice the confession would be excluded under section 76 PACE.

Other admissible evidence may be excluded, at the discretion of the trial judge under 78 PACE, or at common law, if the judge can be persuaded that having regard to all the circumstances including how the evidence was obtained "admission of the evidence would have such an adverse effect on the fairness of the proceedings that the court ought not to admit it."

In the United States and other countries, evidence may be excluded from a trial if it is the result of illegal activity by law enforcement, such as a search conducted without a warrant. Such illegal evidence is known as the fruit of the poisonous tree and is normally not permitted at trial.

== Authentication ==
Certain kinds of evidence, such as documentary evidence, are subject to the requirement that the offeror provide the trial judge with a certain amount of evidence (which need not be much and it need not be very strong) suggesting that the offered item of tangible evidence (e.g., a document, a gun) is what the offeror claims it is. This authentication requirement has import primarily in jury trials. If evidence of authenticity is lacking in a bench trial, the trial judge will simply dismiss the evidence as unpersuasive or irrelevant. Other kinds of evidence can be self-authenticating and require nothing to prove that the item is tangible evidence. Examples of self-authenticating evidence includes signed and certified public documents, newspapers, and acknowledged documents.

== Witnesses ==
In systems of proof based on the English common law tradition, almost all evidence must be sponsored by a witness, who has sworn or solemnly affirmed to tell the truth. The bulk of the law of evidence regulates the types of evidence that may be sought from witnesses and the manner in which the interrogation of witnesses is conducted such as during direct examination and cross-examination of witnesses. Otherwise types of evidentiary rules specify the standards of persuasion (e.g., proof beyond a reasonable doubt) that a trier of fact—whether judge or jury—must apply when it assesses evidence.

Today all persons are presumed to be qualified to serve as witnesses in trials and other legal proceedings, and all persons are also presumed to have a legal obligation to serve as witnesses if their testimony is sought. However, legal rules sometimes exempt people from the obligation to give evidence and legal rules disqualify people from serving as witnesses under some circumstances.

Privilege rules give the holder of the privilege a right to prevent a witness from giving testimony. These privileges are ordinarily (but not always) designed to protect socially valued types of confidential communications. Some of the privileges that are often recognized in various U.S. jurisdictions are spousal privilege, attorney–client privilege, doctor–patient privilege, state secrets privilege, and clergy–penitent privilege. A variety of additional privileges are recognized in different jurisdictions, but the list of recognized privileges varies from jurisdiction to jurisdiction; for example, some jurisdictions recognize a social worker–client privilege and other jurisdictions do not.

Witness competence rules are legal rules that specify circumstances under which persons are ineligible to serve as witnesses. For example, neither a judge nor a juror is competent to testify in a trial in which the judge or the juror serves in that capacity; and in jurisdictions with a dead man statute, a person is deemed not competent to testify as to statements of or transactions with a deceased opposing party.

Often, a law will govern the rules affecting the giving of evidence by witnesses in court. An example is the Evidence Act (NSW) 1995 which sets out the procedures for witnesses to follow in New South Wales, Australia.

== Hearsay ==
Hearsay is one of the largest and most complex areas of the law of evidence in common-law jurisdictions. The default rule is that hearsay evidence is inadmissible. Hearsay is an out of court statement offered to prove the truth of the matter asserted. A party is offering a statement to prove the truth of the matter asserted if the party is trying to prove that the assertion made by the declarant (the maker of the out-of-trial statement) is true. For example, prior to trial Bob says, "Jane went to the store." If the party offering this statement as evidence at trial is trying to prove that Jane actually went to the store, the statement is being offered to prove the truth of the matter asserted. However, at both common law and under evidence codifications such as the Federal Rules of Evidence, there are dozens of exemptions from and exceptions to the hearsay rule.

== Direct vs. circumstantial evidence ==
Direct evidence is any evidence that directly proves or disproves a fact. The most well-known type of direct evidence is a testimony from an eyewitness. In eye-witness testimonies the witness states exactly what they experienced, saw, or heard. Direct evidence may also be found in the form of documents. In cases that involve a breach of contract, the contract itself would be considered direct evidence as it can directly prove or disprove that there was breach of contract. Circumstantial evidence, however, is evidence that does not point directly to a fact and requires an inference in order to prove that fact.

A common example of the distinction between direct and circumstantial evidence involves a person who comes into a building, when it may be raining. If the person declares, "It's raining outside", that statement is direct evidence that it is raining. If the person is carrying a wet umbrella, and he is wearing a wet rain coat, those observations are circumstantial evidence that it is raining outside.

== Burdens of proof ==
Different types of proceedings require parties to meet different burdens of proof, the typical examples being beyond a reasonable doubt, clear and convincing evidence, and preponderance of the evidence. Many jurisdictions have burden-shifting provisions, which require that if one party produces evidence tending to prove a certain point, the burden shifts to the other party to produce superior evidence tending to disprove it.

One special category of information in this area includes things of which the court may take judicial notice. This category covers matters that are so well known that the court may deem them proved without the introduction of any evidence. For example, if a defendant is alleged to have illegally transported goods across a state line by driving them from Boston to Los Angeles, the court may take judicial notice of the fact that it is impossible to drive from Boston to Los Angeles without crossing a number of state lines. In a civil case, where the court takes judicial notice of the fact, that fact is deemed conclusively proved. In a criminal case, however, the defense may always submit evidence to rebut a point for which judicial notice has been taken.

== Evidentiary rules stemming from other areas of law ==
Some rules that affect the admissibility of evidence are nonetheless considered to belong to other areas of law. These include the exclusionary rule of criminal procedure, which prohibits the admission in a criminal trial of evidence gained by unconstitutional means, and the parol evidence rule of contract law, which prohibits the admission of extrinsic evidence of the contents of a written contract.

== Evidence as an area of study ==
In countries that follow the civil law system, evidence is normally studied as a branch of procedural law.

All American law schools offer a course in evidence, and most require the subject either as a first year class, or as an upper-level class, or as a prerequisite to later courses. Furthermore, evidence is heavily tested on the Multistate Bar Examination (MBE) - approximately one-sixth of the questions asked in that test will be in the area of evidence. The MBE predominantly tests evidence under the Federal Rules of Evidence, giving little attention to matters on which the law of different states is likely to be inconsistent.

== Tampering, falsification, and spoliation ==
Acts that conceal, corrupt, or destroy evidence can be considered spoliation of evidence or tampering with evidence. Spoliation is usually the civil-law or due-process variant, may involve intent or negligence, may affect the outcome of a case in which the evidence is material, and may or may not result in criminal prosecution. Tampering is usually the criminal law variant in which a person alters, conceals, falsifies, or destroys evidence to interfere with a law-enforcement, governmental, or regulatory investigation, and is usually defined as a crime. Parallel construction is the creation of an untruthful, but plausible, explanation for how the evidence came to be held, which hides its true origins, either to protect sources and methods used, or to avoid the evidence being excluded as unlawfully obtained. Depending on the circumstances, acts to conceal or destroy evidence or misrepresent its true origins might be considered both tampering and spoliation.

== By jurisdiction ==
- Canada Evidence Act
- Evidence Act 2006 (New Zealand)
- Federal Rules of Evidence (United States)

== See also ==
- Adverse inference
- Anecdotal evidence
- Discovery (law)
- Electronic discovery
- Evidence law in the United States
- Evidence under Bayes theorem
- Falsified evidence
- Forensic animation
- Omnibus hearing
- Proof (truth)
- Question of law
- Silent witness rule
- Spectral evidence – testimony about ghosts or apparitions in the Salem witch trials
- Strict rules of evidence
- Ultimate issue (law)
