= Federal Rules of Evidence =

United States law

- Long title: An Act to establish rules of evidence for certain courts and proceedings.
- Enacted by: the 93rd United States Congress

Citations
- Public law: Pub. L. 93-595
- Statutes at Large: 88 Stat. 1926

Legislative history
- Introduced in the House as H.R. 5463 by William L. Hungate on March 12, 1973; Signed into law by President Gerald Ford on January 2, 1975

First adopted in 1975, the Federal Rules of Evidence codify the evidence law that applies in United States federal courts. In addition, many states in the United States have either adopted the Federal Rules of Evidence, with or without local variations, or have revised their own evidence rules or codes to at least partially follow the federal rules.

== History ==
The law of evidence governs the proof of facts and the inferences flowing from such facts during the trial of civil and criminal lawsuits. Before the twentieth century, evidence law was largely the product of decisional law. During the twentieth century, projects such as the California Evidence Code and the Uniform Rules of Evidence encouraged the codification of those common law evidence rules. In 1965, Chief Justice Earl Warren appointed an advisory committee of fifteen to draft the new rules. The committee was composed of U.S. lawyers and U.S. legal scholars.

The Federal Rules of Evidence began as rules proposed pursuant to a statutory grant of authority, the Rules Enabling Act, but were eventually enacted as statutory law.

The United States Supreme Court circulated drafts of the FRE in 1969, 1971 and 1972, but Congress then exercised its power under the Rules Enabling Act to suspend implementation of the FRE until it could study them further. After a long delay blamed on the Watergate scandal, the FRE became federal law on January 2, 1975, when President Ford signed An Act to Establish Rules of Evidence for Certain Courts and Proceedings, Pub. L. 93–595, 88 Stat. 1926.

The law was enacted only after Congress made a series of modifications to the proposed rules. Much of the debate on the Rules stemmed from concerns that came to lawmakers' attention due to the Watergate scandal, particularly questions of privilege. Some of the most prominent congressional amendments when Congress adopted the rules included:

- Prior Inconsistent Statement – Rule 801(d)(1)(A): Congress amended the proposed rule so that the "rule now requires that the prior inconsistent statement be given under oath subject to the penalty of perjury at a trial, hearing, or other proceeding, or in a deposition. The rule as adopted covers statements before a grand jury."
- Privileges – Rule 501: Although the original proposal included thirteen rules providing for various privileges, Congress struck all of them. To guide privileges in the federal courts, Congress adopted Rule 501. The rule specified that except as otherwise provided by Act of Congress or by other federal rules, privileges in the federal courts would be "governed by the principles of the common law as they may be interpreted by the courts of the United States in the light of reason and experience". Rule 501 meant that the entire purpose of the FRE (to provide clarity and supersede prior case law) was defeated in the specific context of the law of privileges. Thus, to this day, attorneys practicing in U.S. federal courts must carefully research current case law to determine the contours of available privileges in the particular circuit and district in which their case is being heard. In contrast, the California Evidence Code, from which the original proposal had been drawn, had expressly codified all evidentiary privileges and then displaced the common law, so that any further privileges in the courts of that state would have to come from the California State Legislature.
- Impeachment by Conviction – Rule 609(a): The rule specified when a party could use evidence of a prior conviction to impeach a witness. Congress reformed most of Rule 609(a), to specify when a court could exercise discretion to admit evidence of a conviction which was a felony, but that the court must admit the prior conviction if the crime was one involving "dishonesty or false statement".

The Advisory Committee Notes still function as an important source of material used by courts to interpret the Rules.

Even though the Federal Rules of Evidence are statutory, the Supreme Court is empowered to amend the Rules, subject to congressional disapproval. However, amendments creating, abolishing, or modifying privileges require affirmative approval by Congress under 28 U.S.C. § 2074.

== Purpose ==
In general, the purpose of rules of evidence is to regulate the evidence that the jury may use to reach a verdict. Historically, the rules of evidence reflected a marked distrust of jurors. The Federal Rules of Evidence strive to eliminate this distrust, and encourage admitting evidence in close cases. Even so, there are some rules that perpetuate the historical mistrust of jurors, expressly limiting the kind of evidence they may receive or the purpose for which they may consider it.

At the same time, the Rules center on a few basic ideas – relevance, unfair surprise, efficiency, reliability, and overall fairness of the adversary process. The Rules grant trial judges broad discretion to admit evidence in the face of competing arguments from the parties. This ensures that the jury has a broad spectrum of evidence before it, but not so much evidence that is repetitive, inflammatory, or confusing. The Rules define relevance broadly and relax the common-law prohibitions on witnesses' competence to testify. Hearsay standards are similarly relaxed, as are the standards for authenticating written documents. At the same time, the judge retains power to exclude evidence that has too great a danger for unfair prejudice to a party due to its inflammatory, repetitive, or confusing nature or its propensity to waste the court's time.

== Structure ==
There are 68 individually numbered rules, divided among 11 articles:

1. General Provisions
  - Rule 101. Scope; Definitions
  - Rule 102. Purpose
  - Rule 103. Rulings on Evidence
  - Rule 104. Preliminary Questions
  - Rule 105. Limiting Evidence that is Not Admissible Against other Parties or for Other Purposes
  - Rule 106. Remainder of or Related Writings or Recorded Statements
2. Judicial Notice
  - Rule 201. Judicial Notice of Adjudicative Facts
3. Presumptions in Civil Actions and Proceedings
  - Rule 301. Presumptions in Civil Cases Generally
4. Relevancy and Its Limits
  - Rule 401. Test for Relevant Evidence
  - Rule 402. General Admissibility of Relevant Evidence
  - Rule 403. Excluding Relevant Evidence for Prejudice, Confusion, Waste of Time, or Other Reasons
  - Rule 404. Character Evidence; Other Crimes, Wrongs or Acts
  - Rule 405. Methods of Proving Character
  - Rule 406. Habit; Routine Practice
  - Rule 407. Subsequent Remedial Measures
  - Rule 408. Compromise Offers and Negotiations
  - Rule 409. Offers to Pay Medical and Similar Expenses
  - Rule 410. Pleas, Plea Discussions, and Related Statements
  - Rule 411. Liability Insurance
  - Rule 412. Sex–Offense Cases: The Victim's Sexual Behavior or Predisposition.
  - Rule 413. Similar Crimes in Sexual–Assault Cases
  - Rule 414. Similar Crimes in Child–Molestation Cases
  - Rule 415. Similar Acts in Civil Cases Involving Sexual Assault or Child Molestation
5. Privileges
  - Rule 501. Privilege in General
  - Rule 502. Attorney–Client Privilege and Work Product; Limitations on Waiver
6. Witnesses
  - Rule 601. Competency to Testify in General
  - Rule 602. Need for Personal Knowledge
  - Rule 603. Oath or Affirmation to Testify Truthfully
  - Rule 604. Interpreter
  - Rule 605. Judge's Competency as a Witness
  - Rule 606. Juror's Competency as a Witness.
  - Rule 607. Who May Impeach a Witness
  - Rule 608. A Witness's Character for Truthfulness or Untruthfulness
  - Rule 609. Impeachment by Evidence of a Criminal Conviction
  - Rule 610. Religious Beliefs or Opinions
  - Rule 611. Mode and Order of Examining Witnesses and Presenting Evidence
  - Rule 612. Writing Used to Refresh a Witness's Memory
  - Rule 613. Witness's Prior Statement
  - Rule 614. Court's Calling or Examining a Witness
  - Rule 615. Excluding Witnesses
7. Opinions and Expert Testimony
  - Rule 701. Opinion Testimony by Lay Witnesses
  - Rule 702. Testimony by Expert Witnesses
  - Rule 703. Bases of an Expert's Opinion Testimony
  - Rule 704. Opinion on an Ultimate Issue
  - Rule 705. Disclosing the Facts or Data Underlying an Expert's Opinion
  - Rule 706. Court–Appointed Expert Witnesses
8. Hearsay
  - Rule 801. Definitions that Apply to this Article; Exclusions from Hearsay
  - Rule 802. The Rule Against Hearsay
  - Rule 803. Exceptions to the Rule Against Hearsay–Regardless of Whether the Declarant is Available as a Witness
  - Rule 804. Exceptions to the Rule Against Hearsay–when the Declarant is Unavailable as a Witness
  - Rule 805. Hearsay Within Hearsay
  - Rule 806. Attacking and Supporting the Declarant's Credibility
  - Rule 807. Residual Exceptions
9. Authentication and Identification
  - Rule 901. Authenticating or Identifying Evidence
  - Rule 902. Evidence that is Self–Authenticating
  - Rule 903. Subscribing Witness's Testimony
10. Contents of Writings, Recordings, and Photographs
  - Rule 1001. Definitions that Apply to this Article.
  - Rule 1002. Requirement of the Original
  - Rule 1003. Admissibility of Duplicates
  - Rule 1004. Admissibility of Other Evidence of Content
  - Rule 1005. Copies of Public Records to Prove Content
  - Rule 1006. Summaries to Prove Content
  - Rule 1007. Testimony or Statement of a Party to Prove Content
  - Rule 1008. Functions of the Court and Jury
11. Miscellaneous Rules
  - Rule 1101. Applicability of the Rules
  - Rule 1102. Amendments
  - Rule 1103. Title

The Rules embody some very common concepts, and lawyers frequently refer to those concepts by the rule number. The most important concept – the balancing of relevance against other competing interests – is embodied in Rule 403.

The court may exclude relevant evidence if its probative value is substantially outweighed by a danger of one or more of the following: unfair prejudice, confusing the issues, misleading the jury, undue delay, wasting time, or needlessly presenting cumulative evidence.

One of the most common competing interests is the danger of prejudice. An example of otherwise relevant testimony being barred for the danger of unfair prejudice is as follows: A person is on trial for committing a crime. The defendant's alibi is that he was at a meeting of the Knights of the Ku Klux Klan during the time the crime was committed. The defendant has numerous witnesses who can place him at this meeting. The relevant part of this testimony is that the defendant was at a place other than the scene of the crime at the time the crime was committed. On cross examination it is generally relevant to delve into specifics about any alleged alibi such as who was there, what type of meeting it was etc. to ensure the defendant is being truthful. However the relevance of what type of meeting the defendant was attending to weighing the credibility of the story in this example is substantially outweighed by a danger of unfair prejudice as the majority of Americans would view the defendant's participation in the Knights of the Ku Klux Klan to be immoral and is therefore inadmissible.

While the rules proscribe certain testimony from being admissible for one purpose, but it may be admissible for another. An example of this is Rule 404, specifically 404(b) as it pertains to specific instances of a person's conduct. While 404 generally prohibits use of prior acts and crimes to show that a defendant acted in accordance with those prior acts or crimes, 404(b) provides:

1. 404(b) Other crimes, wrongs, or acts.
  (2) Permitted uses; notice in a criminal case. This evidence may be admissible for another purpose, such as proving motive, opportunity, intent, preparation, plan, knowledge, identity, absence of mistake, or lack of accident.

Essentially testimony about an act a person has committed in the past is not admissible for the purposes of showing it is more likely that they committed the same act, however it could be admissible for another purpose, such as knowledge or lack of mistake. For example, in a DUI case, the prosecutor may not admit evidence of a prior instance of driving impaired to show that the defendant acted in conformity and drove impaired on the day he is charged with doing so. However such evidence may be admissible if the defense has argued the defendant had no knowledge driving impaired was a crime. Evidence of his prior arrest, conviction, or other circumstances surrounding his prior instance of impaired driving then becomes admissible to rebut the claim of "mistake." The testimony is now being offered not for conformity but to demonstrate knowledge or lack of mistake.

Other common-law concepts with previously amorphous limits have been more clearly delineated. This is especially true regarding hearsay evidence. Among scholars and in historical judicial decisions, four related definitions of "hearsay" emerged, and the various exceptions and exemptions flowed from the particular definition preferred by the scholar or court. The Federal Rules of Evidence settled on one of these four definitions and then fixed the various exceptions and exemptions in relation to the preferred definition of hearsay.

On the other hand, the law of privileges remains a creature of federal common law under the Rules, rather than the subject of judicial interpretation of the text of the rule. Just as the Uniform Rules of Evidence had, the advisory committee draft of the rules that the Supreme Court formally transmitted to Congress codified nine evidentiary privileges – required reports, attorney-client, psychotherapist-patient, husband-wife, communications to clergymen, political vote, trade secrets, official secrets, and identity of informer. When debate over the privileges included in the proposed Rules threatened to delay adoption of the Rules in their entirety, Congress replaced the proposed codified privileges with what became Rule 501.

Except as otherwise required by the Constitution of the United States or provided by Act of Congress or in rules prescribed by the Supreme Court pursuant to statutory authority, the privilege of a witness, person, government, State, or political subdivision thereof shall be governed by the principles of the common law as they may be interpreted by the courts of the United States in the light of reason and experience. However, in civil actions and proceedings, with respect to an element of a claim or defense as to which State law supplies the rule of decision, the privilege of a witness, person, government, State, or political subdivision thereof shall be determined in accordance with State law.

The scope of the privileges under the Rules thus is the subject of federal common law, except in those situations where state law supplies the rule to be applied. Accordingly, the Supreme Court is ultimately responsible for determining which privileges exist. In the years since the adoption of the Rules, the Court has both expressly adopted a privilege, in Jaffee v. Redmond, 518 U.S. 1 (1996), and expressly declined to adopt a privilege, in University of Pennsylvania v. EEOC, 493 U.S. 182 (1990).

When it comes to the FRE 106, under Adams, if a party seeks to enter into evidence additional parts of the writing or recording, the additional parts need not be "admissible" (i.e. comport with the other rules of evidence).

== Restyling ==
On December 1, 2011, the restyled Federal Rules of Evidence became effective.

Since the early 2000s, an effort had been underway to restyle the Federal Rules of Evidence as well as other federal court rules (e.g. the Federal Rules of Civil Procedure). According to a statement by the advisory committee that had drafted the restyled rules, the restyling was not to make substantive changes to the evidentiary rules but was instead purely stylistic. On April 26, 2011, the U.S. Supreme Court approved the restyled amendments to the Federal Rules of Evidence. Under the Rules Enabling Act, the restyled amendments took effect.

== 2019 Amendment ==
On December 1, 2019, there was an amendment to Rule 807 Residual Exception, which provides the court more discretion to admit statements under Rule 807. The amendment was proposed and accepted on April 25, 2019. Previously the "equivalence" standard was difficult for the court system to apply, so it was eliminated and replaced with considering corroborating evidence in a uniform approach.

== 2020 Amendment ==
On December 1, 2020, there was an amendment to Rule 404(b) Crimes, Wrongs, or Acts, to provide additional notice requirements in the prosecution of a criminal case. The amendment was proposed and accepted on April 27, 2019. It also makes note that the writing requirement for notice can be satisfied by an electronic notice.

== 2023 Amendment ==
On December 1, 2023, a further amendment went into effect. Rules 106, 615, and 702 were affected.
