= Evidence Act 2006 =

Act of Parliament in New Zealand

New Zealand Parliament
- Long title: An Act to help secure the just determination of proceedings by— (a) providing for facts to be established by the application of logical rules; and (b) providing rules of evidence that recognise the importance of the rights affirmed by the New Zealand Bill of Rights Act 1990; and (c) promoting fairness to parties and witnesses; and (d) protecting rights of confidentiality and other important public interests; and (e) avoiding unjustifiable expense and delay; and (f) enhancing access to the law of evidence.
- Passed: 23 November 2006
- Royal assent: 4 December 2006
- Commenced: 18 July 2007 (sections 203 to 214); 1 August 2007 (remainder)

Amended by
- Evidence Amendment Act 2016
- Status: Current legislation

The Evidence Act 2006 is an Act of the Parliament of New Zealand that codifies the laws of evidence. When enacted, the Act drew together the common law and statutory provisions relating to evidence into one comprehensive scheme, replacing most of the previous evidence law on the admissibility and use of evidence in court proceedings.

The foundations of the Act started in August 1989, when the Law Commission started work on reviewing the nation's piecemeal evidence laws. A decade of work culminated in August 1999 with the Commission producing a draft Evidence Code on which the Evidence Act is based. The Evidence Bill was introduced in May 2006 and passed its third and final reading on 23 November 2006. The majority of the Act came into force on 1 August 2007.

== Structure ==
- Part 1 — Preliminary provisions (s 6-15)
- Part 2 — Admissibility rules, privilege, and confidentiality
  - Subpart 1 — Hearsay evidence (s 16-22A)
  - Subpart 2 — Statements of opinion and expert evidence (s 23-26)
  - Subpart 3 — Defendants’ statements, improperly obtained evidence, silence of parties in proceedings, and admissions in civil proceedings (s 27-34)
  - Subpart 4 — Previous consistent statements made by witness (s 35)
  - Subpart 5 — Veracity and propensity (s 36-44A)
  - Subpart 6 — Identification evidence (s 45-46A)
  - Subpart 7 — Evidence of convictions and civil judgments (s 47-50)
  - Subpart 8 — Privilege and confidentiality (s 51-70)
- Part 3 — Trial process
  - Subpart 1 — Eligibility and compellability (s 71-76)
  - Subpart 2 — Oaths and affirmations (s 77-78)
  - Subpart 3 — Support, communication assistance, and views (s 79-82)
  - Subpart 4 — Questioning of witnesses (s 83-101)
  - Subpart 5 — Alternative ways of giving evidence (s 102-120)
  - Subpart 6 — Corroboration, judicial directions, and judicial warnings (s 121-127)
  - Subpart 7 — Notice of uncontroverted facts and reference to reliable public documents (s 128-129)
  - Subpart 8 — Documentary evidence and evidence produced by machine, device, or technical process (s 130-149)
- Part 4 — Evidence from overseas or to be used overseas
  - Subpart 1 — Proceedings in Australia and New Zealand (s 150-181)
  - Subpart 2 — Evidence for use in civil proceedings overseas and evidence for use in civil proceedings in High Court (s 182-189)
  - Subpart 3 — Evidence for use in overseas criminal proceedings (s 190-198)
  - Subpart 4 — Rules and regulations (s 199-200)
- Part 5 — Miscellaneous (s 201-216)

== Legislative features ==
Sections 1 and 2 relate to the title and commencement of the Act respectively.

=== Preliminary provisions ===
Section 3 provides the Act binds the Crown. Section 4 defines terms used in the Act.

Section 5 deals with the application of the Act. If there is an inconsistency between the Act and any other enactment, the other enactment prevails. However, if there is an inconsistency between the Act and the High Court Rules or the District Court Rules, the Act prevails.

Section 6 sets out the purpose of the Act.

Section 7 of the Bill deals with the principle of relevance. The general rule is that, unless otherwise provided, relevant evidence is admissible in proceedings. Evidence that is not relevant is inadmissible. Evidence is relevant if it has a tendency to prove or disprove anything that is of consequence to the determination of the proceeding.

Section 8 sets out a general rule that in any proceeding the Judge must exclude evidence if its probative value is outweighed by the risk that the evidence will have an unfairly prejudicial effect on the outcome of the proceeding, or needlessly prolong the proceeding.

Section 9 deals with the admission of evidence by consent. It allows the admission of otherwise inadmissible evidence with the consent of all parties and the admission of evidence in any way or form agreed by all parties. It also allows the prosecution and the defendant to admit any fact and so dispense with the need for proof of that fact in any criminal proceedings.

Section 10 sets out 3 special rules regarding the interpretation of the Act. The Act must be interpreted in a way that promotes its purpose and its principles. The Act is also not subject to any rule that statutes in derogation of the common law should be strictly construed. However, the Act may be interpreted having regard to the common law, but only to the extent that the common law is consistent with its provisions, the promotion of its purpose and its principles, and the application of the rule in section 12.

Section 11 provides that the powers inherent in a court to regulate and prevent abuse of its procedure are not affected by the Bill, except to the extent provided in the Bill.

Section 12 provides that if there are no provisions in the Act or any other enactment regulating the admission of particular items of evidence, or the relevant provisions deal with that question only in part, decisions must be made having regard to the purpose and the principles set out in sections 6 to 8, and the common law, to the extent that it is consistent with the promotion of that purpose and those principles and is relevant to the decisions to be taken.

Section 13 sets out rules to be applied in establishing the relevance of any document.

Section 14 provides for the admission of evidence on a provisional basis.

Section 15 sets out rules governing the admissibility of evidence given for the purposes of establishing whether any particular evidence is admissible in the substantive proceeding.

=== Admissibility rules, privilege and confidentiality ===
==== Hearsay evidence ====
Section 16 clarifies the meaning of the terms circumstances and unavailable as a witness. These terms are relevant to the exception to the hearsay rule which is stated in section 18.

Section 17 states the rule against the admissibility of hearsay statements. The scope of the existing rule has been limited by the definition of hearsay statement in section 4, which limits hearsay statements to statements made by non-witnesses. Thus, under the Bill, it is not hearsay for a witness to recount in evidence what another witness said. Nor is it hearsay if a witness recounts his or her own out-of-court statements (but such evidence may be inadmissible on other grounds, for example under the previous consistent statements rule stated in section 35). Under section 17 a hearsay statement is not admissible except as provided by section 18 or by a provision in another Act, or if a provision of the Act makes the rule against hearsay inapplicable and the statement is relevant and otherwise admissible.

Section 18 provides that a hearsay statement is admissible if, first, there is a reasonable assurance that it is reliable because of the circumstances that relate to it, and, secondly, if the maker of the statement is unavailable as a witness. The second condition may be waived if the Judge considers that undue expense and delay would be caused by requiring the maker of the statement to testify. This section codifies the common law exception created in the 1989 case R v Baker.

Section 19 allow a hearsay statement contained in a business record to be admitted without having to separately satisfy the reliability test.

Section 22 provides no hearsay statement may be offered in a criminal proceeding unless the other parties have been given notice of the proposed hearsay statement or if every other party has waived the notice requirements or if the Judge dispenses with those requirements. The section also sets out the notice requirements for hearsay statements proposed to be offered in criminal proceedings.

==== Statements of opinion and expert evidence ====
Section 23 states the opinion rule, which is that statements of opinion are inadmissible except as provided by section 24 or 25.

Section 24 enables any witness (whether an expert or not) to state an opinion in evidence if that is necessary for the evidence to be communicated or understood. For example, the speed at which a vehicle was observed to be travelling may be stated in evidence, even though that statement contains an opinion component.

Section 25 makes opinions expressed by experts as part of expert evidence admissible if the Judge or jury is likely to obtain substantial help from them. It also clarifies that certain common law rules against the admission of expert evidence cease to apply. These are the rules that bar an expert from giving evidence on the ultimate issue to be decided by the Judge or jury, and from giving evidence on matters of common knowledge. The section also provides that, where experts base their opinions on facts outside their expertise, the opinions may be relied on only if the facts are proved or judicially noticed.

==== Defendants’ statements, improperly obtained evidence, silence of parties in proceedings, and admissions in civil proceedings ====
Section 27 relates to criminal proceedings. The prosecution may offer evidence of statements made by the defendant if those statements are not excluded by the Judge because there is a question as to their reliability (section 28) or because there is a question as to whether they were influenced by oppressive conduct (section 29), or because they were improperly obtained (section 30).

Section 28 deals with the case where the defence raises, on the basis of an evidential foundation, an issue about the reliability of a defendant's statement that the prosecution offers or intends to offer in the proceeding, or where the issue is raised by the Judge. In such a case, the Judge must exclude the statement unless satisfied that the circumstances in which the statement was made were not likely to have adversely affected its reliability. The standard to which the Judge must be satisfied is the balance of probabilities. Subsection (4) sets out a list of matters that a Judge must (if relevant) take into account for the purpose of applying the reliability test. The list does not preclude a Judge from taking other matters into account. The matters in the list, which must be taken into account, include any physical, mental, or psychological condition of the defendant at the time the statement was made, any pertinent characteristics of the defendant (for example, intellectual disability), the nature of any questions put to the defendant, and the nature of any threat, promise, or representation made to the defendant or any other person.

Section 29 deals with the case where the defence raises, on the basis of an evidential foundation, the issue of whether a defendant's statement that the prosecution offers or intends to offer was obtained by oppressive, violent, inhuman, or degrading conduct or treatment or a threat of such conduct or treatment, or where the Judge raises the issue. In such a case, the Judge must exclude the statement unless satisfied beyond reasonable doubt that the statement was not influenced by such conduct, treatment, or threats. For the purpose of determining whether the statement must be excluded, it is irrelevant whether or not the statement is true. Subsection (4) sets out a list of matters that a Judge must (if relevant) take into account for the purpose of applying the reliability test. The list is the same as that set out in section 28(4).

Section 30 deals with the case where the defence raises, on the basis of an evidential foundation, the issue of whether evidence that the prosecution offers or intends to offer was improperly obtained, or where the Judge raises the issue. The section applies not only to statements, but also to documents and things that may have been improperly obtained. Improperly obtained means obtained as a result of a breach of any enactment or rule of law by a person bound by the New Zealand Bill of Rights Act 1990; obtained as a result of a statement that the prosecution is precluded from offering against the defendant: or obtained unfairly. If the Judge finds that the evidence has been improperly obtained, the Judge may determine if the exclusion of the evidence is proportionate to the impropriety by means of a balancing process that gives appropriate weight to the impropriety but also takes proper account of the need for an effective and credible system of justice. In undertaking that balancing exercise, the Judge may, among other matters, have regard to the importance of any right breached by the impropriety, the nature of the impropriety, in particular, whether it was deliberate or reckless or done in bad faith, and the seriousness of the offence with which the defendant is charged.

Section 31 prevents the prosecution from relying on a defendant's statement that another party puts in evidence if the prosecution is precluded from using the statement because of sections 28, 29 or 30.

Section 32 prohibits any invitation to the Judge or jury in a criminal trial to draw an inference that the defendant is guilty from the defendant's silence in the course of official questioning before the trial or from the defendant's failure to disclose a defence before trial. The Judge must direct the jury not to draw an inference of guilt from failures of that kind.

Section 33 bars all persons other than the Judge or the defence from commenting on the fact that the defendant did not give evidence at his or her trial.

Section 34 provides for the admissibility of admissions in civil proceedings. However, hearsay admissions may not be used against a third party unless the circumstances relating to the making of the admission provide reasonable assurance that the admission is reliable or the third party consents.

==== Previous consistent statements made by witness ====
Section 35 makes a statement that a witness previously made out of court inadmissible if the statement confirms the evidence the witness gives in court. This rule is subject to 2 exceptions. First, a statement of that kind is admissible to rebut a challenge to the witness's veracity or accuracy. Secondly, a statement of that kind is admissible if the witness is unable to recall the matter to which the evidence relates or whose recall of the matter is imperfect if the circumstances relating to the statement provide a reasonable assurance that it is reliable.

==== Veracity and propensity ====
Section 36 concerns the application of this subpart. The section clarifies that the restrictions on giving evidence about a person's veracity do not apply if the alleged lack of veracity on the part of a defendant is an ingredient of the prosecution (as in a prosecution for perjury) or civil action (as in an action for malicious falsehood).

Section 37 precludes evidence about a person's veracity from being given in criminal or civil proceedings unless the Judge decides that the evidence is substantially helpful. The section sets out several factors that the Judge may, among others, consider in making that assessment. These include, for example, whether the proposed evidence tends to show a lack of veracity because of relevant offending or previous inconsistent statements or because of the person's reputation as an untruthful person. The section also prevents a party from challenging the veracity of the party's own witness unless the witness is declared hostile by the Judge.

Section 38 relates to criminal proceedings. Subject to the test of substantial helpfulness set out in section 37, the defendant may offer evidence about his or her veracity. If the defendant does so, the Judge may permit the prosecution to offer veracity evidence about that defendant.

Section 39 relates to criminal proceedings against multiple defendants. A defendant may give evidence about his or her co-defendant's veracity only if that evidence is relevant to a defence to be raised by the defendant and if prior notice of the proposed evidence has been given to all co-defendants. The notice requirement may be waived by the Judge or the co-defendants.

Section 40 sets out the general rule that propensity evidence (that is evidence that a person tends to act in a particular way or to have a particular state of mind) may be given in a civil or criminal proceeding. That rule is subject to the exceptions set out in sections 41 to 44.

Section 41 relates to criminal proceedings. A defendant may offer propensity evidence about himself or herself. If the defendant does so, the Judge may permit the prosecution to offer propensity evidence about that defendant and, in that case, the prosecution is not subject to the restrictions imposed by section 43 on propensity evidence led by the prosecution.

Section 42 relates to criminal proceedings against multiple defendants. A defendant may give propensity evidence about a co-defendant only if that evidence is relevant to a defence to be raised by the defendant and if prior notice of the proposed evidence has been given to all co-defendants. The notice requirement may be waived by the co-defendants or by the Judge.

Section 43 sets out the restrictions that apply to propensity evidence offered by the prosecution in a criminal proceeding. Such evidence is admissible only if it has a probative value which outweighs any unfairly prejudicial effect on the defendant. The section specifies several matters that the Judge may consider among others. The specified matters include the frequency of the alleged conduct, the timing of the conduct, the similarity between the conduct and the offence charged, the number of persons making allegations against the defendant and the risk of collusion or suggestibility, and the extent to which the conduct and the offence charged are unusual. When assessing the prejudicial effect of propensity evidence on the defendant, the Judge must consider, among many other matters, whether the evidence is likely to unfairly predispose the jury against the defendant, and whether the jury will tend to give disproportionate weight in reaching its verdict to evidence about the defendant's previous conduct.

Section 44 protects complainants in prosecutions for sexual offences from certain questions and evidence about their sexual experience and reputation. The starting point is to exclude evidence or questions that relate to the complainant's reputation in sexual matters or to the complainant's sexual experience with a person other than the defendant. However, the Judge may permit any evidence or a question about that experience if satisfied that it would be contrary to the interests of justice to exclude it because of its direct relevance to the facts in issue or to the question of the appropriate sentence.

Section 44A provides no evidence of a complainant's sexual experience may be offered in a criminal proceeding unless the other parties have been given notice of the proposed statement or if every other party has waived the notice requirements or if the Judge dispenses with those requirements. The section also sets out the notice requirements for evidence proposed to be offered in criminal proceedings.

==== Identification evidence ====
Section 45 relates to criminal proceedings in which evidence about previous visual identifications of an alleged offender obtained by officers of an enforcement agency is proposed to be given. Such evidence is admissible if a formal procedure was followed or there was good reason for not following it unless the defendant proves on the balance of probabilities that the evidence is unreliable. If, without good reason, a formal procedure was not followed, the evidence is inadmissible unless the prosecution proves on the balance of probabilities that the circumstances of the identification were likely to have produced a reliable identification.

Section 46 relates to criminal proceedings in which voice identification evidence is proposed to be offered by the prosecution. Such evidence is inadmissible unless the prosecution proves on the balance of probabilities that the circumstances of the identification were likely to have produced a reliable identification.

==== Evidence of convictions and civil judgments ====
Section 47 provides that in a civil proceeding proof of a person's conviction for an offence is conclusive proof that the person committed the offence unless, in exceptional circumstances, the Judge permits a party to offer contrary evidence.

Section 48 provides that if a proceeding for defamation is based on a statement that a person has committed an offence, proof of the person's conviction for the offence provides conclusive proof that the person committed the offence.

Section 49 makes evidence of a person's conviction generally admissible in criminal proceedings and proof of the person's conviction for an offence is conclusive proof that the person committed the offence unless, in exceptional circumstances, the Judge permits a party to offer contrary evidence. A party who wishes to offer evidence of a person's conviction must first tell the Judge why the evidence is to be offered.

Section 50 provides that a judgment in a civil proceeding is not admissible in another proceeding to prove the existence of a fact established by that judgment.

==== Privilege and confidentiality ====
Section 51 defines the term legal adviser for the purposes of this subpart. The term includes a registered patent attorney, but the services of a registered patent attorney that give rise to legal professional privilege are restricted by section 54(2). It is also made clear that, for the purposes of the subpart, a reference to a communication or to information includes a reference to a communication or information contained in a document. Subsection (3) sets out a special meaning of the term information for the purposes of section 60 to 63. The effect of the definition is to exclude from those clauses (which relate to the privilege against self-incrimination, the discretion as to incrimination under foreign law, and the replacement of the privilege against self-incrimination in the case of Anton Piller orders) documents created before the person concerned is required to provide information. The section also provides that privileged communications may be made and received by authorised representatives. However, this does not apply to the privilege for communications with ministers of religion, the privilege for information obtained by medical practitioners and clinical psychologists, or the privilege for informers.

Section 52 provides procedural mechanisms for the protection of privileged information.

Section 53 describes the effects of various privileges. If the privilege is in respect of a communication (such as the privilege for communications with legal advisers) the privilege holder has the right to refuse to disclose the communication in a proceeding as well as any information contained in the communication and any opinion formed by a person that is based on the communication or information. If the privilege is in respect of information or a document, the privilege holder has the right to refuse to disclose in a proceeding the information or document and any opinion formed by a person that is based on the information or document. In the case of a privilege in respect of a communication, information, opinion, or document (other than the privilege against self-incrimination) the privilege holder may require that the communication, information, opinion, or document not be disclosed in a proceeding by the recipient of the communication or the information, or by the person who gave the opinion or prepared the information or document or by any other person who has received the privileged material with the authority of the privilege holder, in confidence and in relation to the circumstances that have given rise to the privilege. But the class of person barred from disclosing privileged material may be extended by the Court.

Section 54 provides a privilege for clients of legal advisers in confidential communications made for the purpose of obtaining or providing professional legal services. By virtue of section 54, the right not to have such communications disclosed is limited to proceedings. The corresponding legal professional privilege recognised by the common law also protects such communications from disclosure in other situations.

Section 55 excludes accounting records relating to solicitors' trust accounts or nominee companies from the ambit of the privilege conferred by section 54.

Section 56 gives a person who is, or on reasonable grounds contemplates becoming, a party to a proceeding, a privilege in respect of communications or information made, received, compiled, or prepared for the dominant purpose of preparing for the proceeding. The privilege may be displaced in the case of a proceeding under Part 2 of the Oranga Tamariki Act 1989 or under the Care of Children Act 2004 (other than a criminal proceeding), if a Judge is satisfied that it is in the best interests of the child.

Section 57 provides a privilege for parties to a civil dispute in respect of communications and documents made or prepared in confidence and in connection with an attempt to settle the dispute.

Section 58 provides a privilege for a person who confides in a minister of religion in respect of communications made for the purpose of receiving religious or spiritual advice, benefit, or comfort.

Section 59 provides a privilege in criminal proceedings for a person who sees a medical practitioner or clinical psychologist for the purpose of treating a drug addiction or other condition or behaviour that may manifest itself in criminal conduct. The person has a privilege in respect of communications to the medical practitioner or clinical psychologist made for that purpose, in respect of information obtained by the medical practitioner or clinical psychologist for that purpose, and in prescriptions issued by the medical practitioner or clinical psychologist for that purpose.

Section 60 provides a privilege to a person required to provide specific information if providing the information is reasonably likely to lead to the person's prosecution and punishment for any offence under New Zealand law (i.e. self-incrimination). Unless removed or limited by an enactment, whether expressly or by necessary implication, the person cannot be required to produce the information or be penalised for not doing so (whether or not the privilege is claimed). Because of section 51(3), the privilege does not apply to documents in existence when the information is required. The privilege cannot be claimed by corporations.

Section 61 confers a discretion on a Judge to excuse a person from providing information likely to incriminate the person of an offence punishable under foreign law (other than an offence punishable merely by a fine).

Section 62 requires a Judge to ensure that a party or witness is aware of the privilege against self-incrimination, if it appears to the Judge that the party or witness may be entitled to claim the privilege. The section also requires a claimant of the privilege to offer sufficient evidence to enable the claim to be assessed.

Section 63 prevents parties to Anton Piller orders from claiming the privilege against self-incrimination. Anton Piller orders are made by a Judge in a civil proceeding and direct the defendant to let the plaintiff enter his or her premises in order to establish the presence of certain items, and if warranted, to remove them for safekeeping. The scope of the order has widened and can now include a direction that the party disclose information and documents that would not necessarily be found by the search alone. Under the Bill, there is no privilege for pre-existing documents. However, the privilege could be claimed if the party is required to answer potentially self-incriminating questions. If satisfied that self-incrimination is reasonably likely if a party provides the information sought by the order, the Judge must make an order that the information provided not be used in any criminal proceeding against the person providing the information.

Section 64 provides that a person who informs an enforcement agency of possible offences in the reasonable expectation that his or her identity will not be disclosed and who is not called as a witness has a privilege in respect of information that would disclose the person's identity.

Section 65 relates to waiver of privilege. The section provides that a privilege may be waived either expressly or implicitly; that, generally, a privilege is waived if the privilege holder discloses the privileged information in circumstances that are inconsistent with a claim of confidentiality; and that a specific instance of waiver occurs when the privilege holder acts so as to put the privileged information in issue in a proceeding.

Section 66 relates to privilege jointly held by several holders and to privilege acquired by successors. A joint privilege holder may assert the privilege against third parties, may have access to the privileged material, may require the other holders not to disclose the privileged material, and may be ordered by a Judge not to disclose the privileged material. Personal representatives of deceased privilege holders and persons who acquire property related to a privilege have similar rights except that the right of access is limited to the extent that a Judge considers it justified.

Section 67 requires a Judge to disallow a claim of privilege if satisfied there is a prima facie case that the privileged material was communicated or prepared for a dishonest purpose or to enable the commission of an offence. The section authorises a Judge to disallow a privilege if the Judge thinks that evidence of the privileged material is necessary to enable the defendant in a criminal proceeding to present an effective defence. But information disclosed in accordance with such disallowance cannot be used against the holder of the privilege in a proceeding. The section does not apply to the privilege against self-incrimination.

Section 68 protects the identity of the sources of journalists in cases where journalists promise not to disclose their identity. The starting point is that the journalist cannot be compelled to reveal the identity of the source. However, a Judge of the High Court may order that the identity be revealed if satisfied that the public interest in doing this outweighs any likely adverse effect on the source or others as well as the public interest in the ability of the news media to communicate facts and opinions to the public.

Section 69 confers a general discretion on the Judge to protect confidential communications or information from disclosure in a proceeding. To do this, the Judge must be of the view that the public interest in disclosing the information is outweighed by the public interest in preventing harm to persons affected by, or involved in obtaining, communicating, or receiving, the confidential information, or by the public interest in preventing harm to relationships of confidentiality, or by the public interest in maintaining the free flow of information. The section sets out a number of factors to which the Judge must have regard in balancing the interest of disclosure in proceedings against the interests in confidentiality.

Section 70 confers a discretion on a Judge to direct that matters of State not be disclosed if justified in the public interest. The section clarifies that matters of State include information that may need protection for reasons recognised by the Official Information Act 1982.

=== Trial process ===
==== Eligibility and compellability ====
Section 71 sets out the general rule governing the eligibility and compellability of witnesses to give evidence. In general, any person is eligible to give evidence in a civil or criminal proceeding and can be compelled to give that evidence. Section 72 to 75 set out a number of exceptions to the general rule.

Section 72 provides that a person acting as a Judge in a proceeding is not eligible to give evidence in that proceeding. It also provides that except with the permission of the Judge a person who is acting as a juror or counsel in a proceeding is not eligible to give evidence in that proceeding.

Section 73 provides that a defendant in a criminal proceeding is not a compellable witness for the prosecution or the defence in that proceeding. An associated defendant is not compellable to give evidence for or against a defendant in a criminal proceeding unless the associated defendant is being tried separately from the defendant or the proceeding against the associated defendant has been determined.

Section 74 provides that the Sovereign, the Governor-General, a Sovereign or Head of State of a foreign country, and a Judge (in respect of the Judge's conduct as a Judge) are not compellable to give evidence.

Section 75 provides that bank officers cannot be compelled to produce banking records.

Section 76 prohibits the giving of evidence about the deliberation of a jury, except in very limited circumstances. The section requires the Judge to be satisfied, in addition to the requirement that the evidence tends to establish that a juror has acted in breach of the juror's duty, that in the circumstances of the particular case the public interest in protecting the confidentiality of the jury deliberations is outweighed by the public interest in avoiding or remedying any miscarriage of justice.

==== Oaths and affirmations ====
Section 77 requires a witness aged 12 years or over to take an oath or make an affirmation before giving evidence. A witness in a proceeding who is under 12 years must make a promise to tell the truth before giving evidence. Section 77(3) enables the Judge in a proceeding to permit evidence to be given without the witness taking an oath, making an affirmation, or making a promise to tell the truth.

Section 78 requires a person acting as an interpreter to take an oath or make an affirmation before acting as an interpreter. An interpreter includes a person who provides communication assistance.

==== Support, communication assistance, and views ====
Section 79 makes provision for support persons for complainants, child witnesses and other witnesses in criminal proceedings, and regulates their conduct.

Sections 80 and 81 describe when communication assistance is to be provided to a defendant in criminal proceedings, and regulate the provision of that assistance. Section 80(5) proves that wilfully giving false or misleading statements by a person providing communication assistance amounts to perjury.

Section 82 empowers a Judge to hold a view or, if there is a jury, order a view, if the Judge considers that the view is in the interests of justice. A view is defined as an inspection by the Judge or, if there is a jury, by the Judge and jury, of a place or thing that is not in the courtroom.

==== Questioning of witnesses ====
Section 83 provides that the ordinary way for a witness to give evidence is orally in a courtroom or, in certain circumstances, by giving evidence in the form of an affidavit or by reading a written statement in a courtroom.

Section 84 sets out the order in which a witness gives evidence. A witness first gives evidence in chief and may then be cross-examined, and finally may be re-examined.

Section 85 allows the Judge in any proceeding to disallow or permit a witness to refuse to answer any question that the Judge considers intimidating, improper, unfair, misleading, needlessly repetitive, or expressed in language that is too complicated for the witness to understand.

Section 86 provides that a person commits contempt of court who prints or publishes material relating to a question that has been disallowed or in breach of any order of the Judge made in relation to a question that a witness is not obliged to answer.

Section 87 and 88 restrict questioning, the giving of evidence, or the making of statements or remarks about the precise address of any witness and the occupation of a complainant in a sexual case, respectively. In general, such questioning and evidence and the making of any such statements or remarks, is prohibited unless the Judge considers that exclusion would be contrary to the interests of justice.

Section 89 restricts the use of leading questions in examination in chief or re-examination of a witness.

Section 90 regulates the use of written statements in questioning witnesses.

Section 91 enables the editing of statements by parties to exclude evidence ruled by the Judge to be inadmissible.

Section 92 sets out the cross-examination duties of the parties. A party must cross-examine a witness on substantial matters that contradict the evidence of the witness if the witness is, or might be, in a position to give admissible evidence on those matters. The section also deals with the effect of a failure by a party to comply with his or her cross-examination duties and the orders which may be made by the Judge.

Section 93 enables a Judge to limit cross-examination in any proceeding of a witness who has the same, or substantially the same, interest in the proceedings as the cross-examining party.

Section 94 enables a party to cross-examine a witness called by that party if the Judge determines that the witness is hostile and gives permission for the cross-examination.

Section 95 prohibits a defendant in a criminal proceeding that is a sexual case or is a proceeding concerning domestic violence from personally cross-examining a complainant or a child who is a witness. The section also enables the Judge to make an order in any civil or criminal proceeding preventing a party to the proceeding from personally cross-examining a particular witness.

Section 96 regulates the cross-examination of a witness on a previous statement made by that witness.

Section 97 regulates the matters that may be subject to re-examination of any witness.

Section 98 prohibits a party from offering further evidence after closing that party's case, except with the permission of the Judge.

Section 99 empowers a Judge to recall a witness who has given evidence in a proceeding if the Judge considers it in the interests of justice to do so.

Section 100 empowers a Judge to ask a witness any questions that, in the opinion of the Judge, justice requires, and provides for further cross-examination and re-examination on any matter raised by the Judge's questions.

Section 101 regulates the manner in which juries may put a question to a witness.

==== Alternative ways of giving evidence ====
Section 102 deals with the application of the subpart. It provides that the general rules dealing with alternative ways of giving evidence are subject to a number of provisions dealing with specific situations.

Section 103 empowers a Judge to give directions in any proceeding that a witness is to give evidence in chief and be cross-examined in the ordinary way or in an alternative way as provided in section 105.

Section 104 requires a chambers hearing, at which each party has an opportunity to be heard, if an application is made for directions under Section 103.

Section 105 sets out alternative ways in which a witness may give evidence. This includes behind a screen, via CCTV or video conference call, or by video record.

Section 106 regulates the use of video record evidence (which is one of the alternative ways of giving evidence) authorised by section 105.

Section 107 provides a child witness in criminal proceedings the automatic right to give evidence in an alternative way. Sections 107A and 107B allows parties to request the child witness to give evidence in the ordinary way, or in a mixture of the ordinary way and an alternative way respectively, if it is in the interests of justice to do so.

Sections 108 and 109 repeat the special provisions relating to the giving of evidence by undercover police officers. Those provisions are designed to ensure that the identity and place of residence of an undercover police officer is kept secret, except in very limited circumstances.

Sections 110 to 118 set out the special provisions relating to the giving of evidence by anonymous witnesses and witnesses in the police witness protection programme.

Section 120 allows an undercover police officer or an anonymous witness to sign statements under an assumed name.

==== Corroboration, judicial directions, and judicial warnings ====
Section 121 deals with the topic of corroboration. It provides that it is not necessary in a criminal proceeding for the evidence on which the prosecution relies to be corroborated, except with respect to the offences of perjury, false oaths, false statements or declarations, and treason. The section also deals with the question of when a warning or direction relating to the absence of corroboration should be given.

Section 122 requires the Judge, if he or she considers that any evidence given in a criminal proceeding tried with a jury may be unreliable, to warn the jury of the need for caution in deciding whether to accept the evidence or the weight to be given to it.

Section 123 provides for the giving of a direction to a jury, in a case where evidence is given in an alternative way or in accordance with a witness anonymity order, or in a case where the defendant is not permitted to personally cross-examine the defendant. The direction must, amongst other matters, indicate that the jury must not draw any adverse inference against the defendant because of that manner of giving evidence or questioning.

Section 124 deals with the question of when, in a criminal proceeding tried before a jury where there is evidence that a defendant has lied either before or during the proceeding, a judicial warning should be given about lies and the form of any direction.

Section 125 deals with the giving of judicial directions in relation to children's evidence. In general, evidence given by children is to be treated in the same way as evidence by adults, in the absence of expert evidence to the contrary.

Section 126 requires the Judge, in a criminal proceeding tried with a jury in which the case against the defendant depends wholly or substantially on the correctness of 1 or more visual or voice identifications of the defendant or of any other person, to warn the jury of the special need for caution before finding the defendant guilty in reliance on the correctness of any such identification.

Section 127 relates to the directions that may be given to a jury if issues arise in a sexual case tried before a jury about a delay in making, or failure to make, a complaint in respect of the offence.

==== Notice of uncontroverted facts and reference to reliable public documents ====
Section 128 provides that judicial notice may be taken of certain facts.

Section 129 allows a Judge to admit, in matters of public history, literature, science, or art, certain published documents without compliance with the rules relating to hearsay evidence and opinion evidence.

==== Documentary evidence and evidence produced by machine, device, or technical process ====
Section 130 sets out a procedure which enables a party, on giving notice to the other parties, to offer a document in evidence without calling a witness to produce the document.

Section 133 enables evidence of a voluminous document or compilation of documents to be given, after giving notice to the other parties and with the permission of the Judge, by means of a summary or chart.

Section 135 deals with the admission of translations of documents and transcripts of information or other matters.

Section 136 relates to the proof of signatures on attested documents.

Section 137 relates to the status of any evidence provided by machine, device, or technical process.

Section 138 provides that documents purporting to be public documents or copies of or extracts from such documents are, if sealed or certified in a certain manner, presumed to be authentic, in the absence of proof to the contrary.

Section 139 contains provisions relating to the proof of convictions, acquittals, and other judicial proceedings.

Section 140 relates to the proof of a conviction by use of fingerprints.

Section 141 provides that certain documents purporting to be New Zealand or foreign official documents that have been printed or published in a manner specified in the section, are presumed to be authentic, in the absence of proof to the contrary.

Section 142 makes similar provision in respect of certain official acts notified or published in the manner specified in the section.

Section 143 contains similar rules to section 142 in relation to New Zealand and foreign official seals and signatures.

Section 144 sets out a procedure for admitting in evidence a statute or other written law, proclamation, treaty, or act of State of a foreign country.

Sections 145 to 147 implement the Hague Convention Abolishing the Requirement of Legalisation for Foreign Public Documents.

Sections 148 and 149 enables certain documents admissible under Australian law to be admitted in evidence in New Zealand.

=== Miscellaneous provisions ===
Section 201 empowers the making of regulations necessary for the purposes of the Act.

Section 202 provides for a periodic review of the operation of the Act by the Law Commission.

Sections 203 to 214 set out transitional provisions.

Section 215 provides that the enactments specified in Schedule 1 are repealed. This included the Evidence Act 1908 in its entirety, as well as some sections of the Crimes Act 1961, Juries Act 1981, and Summary Proceedings Act 1957.

Clause 216 provides that the enactments specified in Schedule 2 are consequentially amended.

== History ==
Prior to the Act, evidence law in New Zealand was largely Judge-made, comprising decisions that were made in response to the circumstances of particular cases. The statutory provisions dealing with evidence were contained in a number of statutes, and have been reformed on a piecemeal basis, responding to issues as they arise. The resulting complexity and inconsistency of the law of evidence results in undue legal argument, expense, and delays in proceedings to accommodate arguments over issues of admissibility.

In August 1989, the Law Commission was instructed by Minister of Justice Geoffrey Palmer to make the law of evidence as clear, simple, and accessible as practicable, and to facilitate the fair, just, and speedy judicial resolution of disputes. With this purpose in mind the Law Commission was asked to examine the statutory and common law governing evidence in proceedings before courts and tribunals and to make recommendations for its reform with a view to codification.

In April 1991, the Law Commission published the first of a series of discussion papers on aspects of evidence law. This paper dealt with the principles on reform, codification, and hearsay. Between then and 1997, the Law Commission published a number of further discussion papers on major aspects of evidence law: expert evidence and opinion evidence, privilege, documentary evidence, character and credibility, the evidence of children and other vulnerable witnesses. Alongside the review, the Commission published discussion papers on the privilege against self-incrimination and police questioning in relation to a review on criminal procedure.

The work of the Law Commission culminated on 24 August 1999, when the Commission published its final report entitled Evidence – Reform of the Law. Included was a draft Evidence Code, to which the Act is based on.

The Evidence Bill was introduced in the House of Representatives on 3 May 2005. The bill passed its first reading a week later on 10 May. The Justice and Electoral Select Committee scrutinised the bill, reporting back on 24 October 2006 that the bill should be passed with amendments. The Bill passed its second reading on 15 November 2006 and its third and final reading on 23 November 2006. The Bill passed all three readings unanimously.

The Bill received the Royal Assent on 4 December 2006, becoming the Evidence Act 2006. Some transitional provisions came into force on 18 July 2007, with the rest of the Act coming into force on 1 August 2007.

== Reviews and amendments ==
As enacted, Section 202 of the Act required the Minister of Justice to instruct the Law Commission to review the Act every 5 years. The minimum terms of reference include examining the operation of the Act's provision since the last review, and whether the provision should be retained, amended or repealed. The requirement for the Law Commission to conduct periodic reviews was repealed in 2022.

The first review was initiated in February 2012, with the Law Commission reporting back in March 2013. The resulting recommendations were incorporated into the Evidence Amendment Act 2016.

The second review was initiated in February 2017, with the Law Commission reporting back in February 2019.

The third review was initiated in May 2022, with the Law Commission reporting back in February 2024.
