= Rule in Queen Caroline's case =

Rule of evidence in British and American law

The Rule in Queen Caroline's Case was a rule of evidence in English and American law that required showing a witness a document before cross-examination about the witness' prior inconsistent statements in the document. The doctrine was formally abolished in the United Kingdom by the Common Law Procedure Act 1854 and in the federal courts of the United States by the Federal Rules of Evidence.

== Background ==
The rule arose during the quasi-trial of Caroline of Brunswick, queen consort of George IV. If the Pains and Penalties Bill 1820 were passed by Parliament, Caroline would have been declared guilty of adultery, furnishing grounds for the King to divorce her.

During the proceedings, one of Queen Caroline's former servants, Louisa Demonte, was called by the prosecution to testify regarding the Queen's character. Demonte gave lengthy testimony regarding "the Queen's romantic adventures throughout Europe." To impeach the witness, the Queen's defense counsel planned to ask her about two letters in which Demonte had spoken positively of Caroline's character, "one of which implied that she had been offered a bribe to testify against the Queen." After two hours of cross-examination, the prosecution objected to the defense's questioning, insisting that "the best evidence of the contents of the letters was the letters themselves." After a brief deliberation, the Lords ruled in favor of the prosecution.

== Subsequent developments in United States law ==
The rule did not gain immediate acceptance in the United States. The Supreme Court of the United States would approve of its adoption by several states in the mid-19th century, writing that "the rule was founded upon common sense, and it is essential to protect the character of a witness." The rule was formally abrogated in federal courts with the adoption of Rule 613 of the Federal Rules of Evidence in 1975. As of 2014, however, fourteen states retained the rule in some form under their own laws or rules of evidence.

== See also ==
- Witness impeachment
- Prior inconsistent statement
