= R v B (KG) =

- Supreme Court of Canada

Hearing: October 8, 1992 Judgment: February 25, 1993
- Full case name: Her Majesty The Queen v KGB
- Citations: [1993] 1 SCR 740
- Docket No.: 22351
- Prior history: Ruling for KGB in the Court of Appeal for Ontario.
- Ruling: The appeal allowed and a new trial ordered.

Holding
- Prior inconsistent statements are admissible where they are necessary and reliable.

Court membership
- Chief Justice: Antonio Lamer; Puisne Justices: Gérard La Forest, Claire L'Heureux-Dubé, John Sopinka, Charles Gonthier, Peter Cory, Beverley McLachlin, William Stevenson, Frank Iacobucci

Reasons given
- Majority: Lamer CJ, joined by Sopinka, Gonthier, McLachlin and Iacobucci JJ
- Concurrence: Cory J, joined by L'Heureux-Dubé J
- La Forest and Stevenson JJ took no part in the consideration or decision of the case.

Laws applied
- R v Smith, [1992] 2 SCR 915; R v Khan, [1990] 2 SCR 531

R v B (KG), [1993] 1 SCR 740, popularly known as the KGB case, is a leading Supreme Court of Canada decision on the admissibility of prior inconsistent statements as proof of the truth of their contents. Prior to this case, prior inconsistent statements made by a witness other than an accused could merely be used to impeach the witness's credibility, not for substantive purposes. Here, the Court held that if the statements could be found to be both necessary and reliable then the statements could be admitted as an exception to the hearsay rule.

== Background ==
Four youths were involved in a fight with two men. One youth pulled out a knife and stabbed one of the men, killing him. During the investigation each youth was interviewed on camera in the presence of family or their lawyer. In three of the statements, reference was made to death likely being caused by K.G.B., one of the four youths.

At trial, however, the youths recanted their videotaped statements and claimed they had lied to exculpate themselves. The trial judge followed the orthodox rule for prior inconsistent statements, and only permitted the jury to use the statements to impeach credibility rather than prove a fact. K.G.B. was acquitted and the decision was upheld on appeal.

The issue before the Supreme Court of Canada was whether the recorded statements could be submitted as evidence to the truth of their contents under the principled exception to hearsay.

== Reasons of the court ==
Chief Justice Antonio Lamer, writing for the majority, held that the statements were admissible. He allowed the appeal and ordered a new trial.

The principled exception to hearsay, as outlined in R v Khan and R v Smith, requires that the statement be reliable and necessary. Lamer CJ adopted these two criteria in formulating the test for admitting prior inconsistent statements. First, "if the statement is made under oath, solemn affirmation or solemn declaration following an explicit warning to the witness as to the existence of severe criminal sanctions for the making of a false statement". Second, "if the statement is videotaped in its entirety". Third, "if the opposing party, whether the Crown or the defence, has a full opportunity to cross‑examine the witness at trial respecting the statement".

Lamer CJ also made clear that substitute reliability guarantors could be accepted in place of these strict guidelines, in certain cases.

== See also ==
- List of Supreme Court of Canada cases (Lamer Court)
- R v U (FJ), [1995] 3 SCR 764; subsequent case modifying the requirements of admitting inconsistent prior statements
