= R v Khan =

- Supreme Court of Canada

Hearing: November 3, 1989 Judgment: September 13, 1990
- Full case name: Abdullah Khan v Her Majesty The Queen
- Citations: [1990] 2 SCR 531

Court membership
- Chief Justice: Brian Dickson; Puisne Justices: Antonio Lamer, Bertha Wilson, Gérard La Forest, Claire L'Heureux-Dubé, John Sopinka, Charles Gonthier, Peter Cory, Beverley McLachlin

Reasons given
- Unanimous reasons by: McLachlin J

R v Khan [1990] 2 SCR 531 is a landmark Supreme Court of Canada decision that began a series of major changes to the hearsay rule and the rules regarding the use of children as witnesses in court. In this case, and subsequently in R v Smith (1992), R v B (KG) (1993), R v U (FJ) (1995), R v Starr (2000), and finally, R v Khelawon (2006), the Court developed the “principled approach” to hearsay, where hearsay statements can be admitted if they are sufficiently reliable and necessary.

== Background ==
In March 1985, Mrs. O and her three-and-half-year-old daughter T went to Dr. Khan for an examination. Khan first examined the daughter in front of her mother, then, while O was changing into hospital gowns in the other room, Khan was alone in his office with T for five to seven minutes. Roughly 15 minutes after leaving Khan's office, the child described to her mother how Khan had sexually assaulted her. A wet spot was found on the sleeve of T's jogging suit, which was later examined by a forensic biologist who determined that the fluid constituted a mixture of semen and saliva. Khan was charged with the assault.

At trial, the judge held that the child was not competent to give unsworn testimony and that he would not admit the statements made by the child to her mother about the assault as it was hearsay and could not fall into the “spontaneous declaration” exception as it was not contemporaneous. On the basis of this finding, Khan was acquitted.

On appeal, the Court of Appeal found that the trial judge had been too strict in the consideration of both testimony and the hearsay. The acquittal was overturned and a new trial ordered.

The issues before the Court were:

1. Did the Court of Appeal err in concluding that the trial judge misdirected himself in ruling that the child witness was incompetent to give unsworn testimony?
2. Did the Court of Appeal err in holding, contrary to the ruling of the trial judge, that a "spontaneous declaration" allegedly made by the child to her mother after the alleged sexual assault was admissible?

== Reasons of the court ==
McLachlin, writing for a unanimous Court, held that the child was competent to testify and the statements should be admitted.

On the first issue, McLachlin noted that the trial judge improperly applied section 16 of the Canada Evidence Act that gave the conditions under which a child can testify. The judge was wrong in finding that since the child did not understand what it meant to tell a lie in court that she could not give testimony. For a child to testify under section 16, the judge must only determine if the witness has sufficient intelligence and an understanding of the duty to tell the truth. Here, the judge found that both criteria were satisfied but inevitably placed too much emphasis on the child's age. McLachlin noted, as an issue of policy, leniency must be given to child testimony otherwise offences against children could never be prosecuted.

On the second issue, McLachlin observed that the judge correctly applied the test for spontaneous declarations. To admit the statement as a "spontaneous declaration" would be to deform the exception beyond recognition. However, rather than have the issue disposed at this juncture, McLachlin went down a different route, changing the course of hearsay law for years to follow. She held that a "principled approach" must be taken to hearsay statements: if the statement was reliable and necessary, it should be admitted.

In the instant case, the child, having aged considerably since the events, was unable to remember what happened, thus making the statement necessary. The statement was deemed reliable for a number of reasons: T should not have had an awareness of the type of acts that had taken place at her young age, she made the statement without any prompting from her mother, and she was disinterested in the litigation, in that she had no reason to lie to her mother and was not aware of the implications of what had happened to her. Finally, T's statement was corroborated by the semen found on her sleeve.

== Aftermath ==
Dr. Khan was retried and convicted of sexual assault of T. He absconded before he could be sentenced.

The College of Physicians and Surgeons of Ontario revoked Dr. Khan's licence to practice medicine. After being overturned on the first appeal, the Ontario Court of Appeal upheld the College's revocation of Dr. Khan's licence to practice medicine.

== See also ==
- List of Supreme Court of Canada cases (Lamer Court)
