= Direct examination =

Questioning of a witness in a trial by the party who called the witness

Direct examination or examination-in-chief is the questioning of a witness by the lawyer/side/party that called such witness in a trial. It is a stage in the process of adducing evidence from witnesses in a court of law. Direct examination is usually performed to elicit evidence in support of facts which will satisfy a required element of a party's claim or defense.

In direct examination, one is generally prohibited from asking leading questions. This prevents a lawyer from feeding answers to a favorable witness. An exception to this rule occurs if one side has called a witness, but it is either understood or becomes clear, that the witness is hostile to the calling lawyer's side of the controversy, the lawyer who called the witness may then ask the court to declare the person on the stand a hostile witness. If the court does so, the lawyer may thereafter ask witness leading questions during direct examination.

The techniques of direct examination are taught in courses on trial advocacy. Each direct examination is integrated with the overall case strategy through either a theme and theory or, with more advanced strategies, a line of effort.

== See also ==
- Cross-examination – Interrogation of a witness called by one's opponent
- Redirect examination – US legal term
