= R v U (FJ) =

Leading case of the Supreme Court of Canada

R v U (FJ) is a leading case of the Supreme Court of Canada. In the decision the court modified the requirements of admissibility of prior statements. In R v B (KG), the court required that prior statements can only be admitted for the truth of its contents where it was under oath and videotaped. In UFJ, the court permitted a less strict standard. The complainants prior statement was admitted for the truth of its contents without being under oath or videotaped where the statement was corroborated by the accused confession. The enhanced reliability of the corroboration and the opportunity to cross-examine the recanting witness was sufficient to remove much of the dangers associated with prior statements.
