= 1982 reasons of the Supreme Court of Canada =

The list below consists of the reasons delivered from the bench by the Supreme Court of Canada during 1982. This list, however, does not include decisions on motions.

== Reasons ==
Delivered the Court's reason
Joined the Court's reason
Filed a concurrence
Joined a concurrence
Filed a dissent
Joined a dissent
Filed a concurrence/dissent
Joined a concurrence/dissent
Did not participate in the judgment
Did not participate in the final disposition of the judgment
Not a member of the Court at the time of hearing or delivering
- Decisions that do not note a Justice delivering the Court's reason are per coram.
- Multiple concurrences and dissents within a case are numbered, with joining votes numbered accordingly. Justices occasionally join multiple reasons in a single case; each vote is subdivided accordingly.
- Multiple unnumbered reasons are jointly written or delivered.
- Decisions that are given orally from the bench are denoted by a "V"; per coram decisions delivered orally from the bench only note a "V" on the most senior justice on the panel.
- An asterisk ( * ) in the Court's opinion denotes that it was only a majority in part or a plurality.

Case name	Argued	Decided	Laskin	Martland (Note: retired on 10 February 1982)	Ritchie	Dickson	Beetz	Estey	McIntyre	Chouinard	Lamer	Wilson (Note: appointed on 4 March 1982)
Harper v The Queen, 1982 CanLII 11, [1982] 1 SCR 2	21 May 1981	26 January 1982										
Korponay v Attorney General of Canada, 1982 CanLII 12, [1982] 1 SCR 41	14 October 1981	26 January 1982										
Continental Insurance Co v Dalton Cartage Co, 1982 CanLII 14, [1982] 1 SCR 164	15 December 1981	26 January 1982										
AG (Nova Scotia) v MacIntyre, 1982 CanLII 14, [1982] 1 SCR 175	3 February 1981	26 January 1982										
Lucier v The Queen, 1982 CanLII 153, [1982] 1 SCR 28	9 June 1981	26 January 1982										
Langille et al v Toronto-Dominion Bank, 1982 CanLII 154, [1982] 1 SCR 34	22 June 1981	26 January 1982										
Re BC Family Relations Act, 1982 CanLII 155, [1982] 1 SCR 62	28–29 January 1981	26 January 1982										
Moore v Johnson et al, 1982 CanLII 156, [1982] 1 SCR 115	7 October 1981	26 January 1982										
Jacobs et al v Agricultural Stabilization Board, 1982 CanLII 157, [1982] 1 SCR 125	8–9 December 1981	26 January 1982										
Minister of Finance of New Brunswick et al v Simpsons-Sears Ltd, 1982 CanLII 158, [1982] 1 SCR 144	14 December 1981	26 January 1982										
Case name	Argued	Decided	Laskin	Martland	Ritchie	Dickson	Beetz	Estey	McIntyre	Chouinard	Lamer	Wilson
Janke v Holzer, 1982 CanLII 163, [1982] 1 SCR 281	4 February 1981	4 February 1982		V								
Ontario Human Rights Commission v Etobicoke, 1982 CanLII 15, [1982] 1 SCR 202	13 May 1981	9 February 1982										
Ford v The Queen, 1982 CanLII 16, [1982] 1 SCR 231	17 March 1981	9 February 1982										
Commission des droits de la personne v Attorney General of Canada, 1982 CanLII 161, [1982] 1 SCR 215	28 October 1981	9 February 1982										
Royal Trust Co v Tucker, 1982 CanLII 162, [1982] 1 SCR 250	12 February 1981	9 February 1982										
Association canadienne-française de l’Ontario v Attorney General of Quebec et al, 1982 CanLII 217, [1982] 2 SCR 789	26 January 1982	9 February 1982										
Reference re Amendment to the Canadian Constitution, 1982 CanLII 218, [1982] 2 SCR 791	26 January 1982	9 February 1982										
Beard v Beard, 1982 CanLII 164, [1982] 1 SCR 282	10 February 1982	10 February 1982	V									
Sterner et al v The Queen, 1982 CanLII 159, [1982] 1 SCR 172	11 February 1982	11 February 1982	V									
Sterner v Vander Kracht, 1982 CanLII 160, [1982] 1 SCR 173	11 February 1982	11 February 1982	V									
Case name	Argued	Decided	Laskin	Martland	Ritchie	Dickson	Beetz	Estey	McIntyre	Chouinard	Lamer	Wilson
Pitre et al v Robinson, 1982 CanLII 165, [1982] 1 SCR 283	23 February 1982	23 February 1982	V									
McGuigan v R, 1982 CanLII 41, [1982] 1 SCR 284	26 October 1981	2 March 1982										
Nepean Hydro Electric Commission v Ontario Hydro, 1982 CanLII 42, [1982] 1 SCR 347	1–2 April 1981	2 March 1982										
Government of the Republic of Italy v Piperno, 1982 CanLII 166, [1982] 1 SCR 320	2 February 1982	2 March 1982										
Flamand v The Queen, 1982 CanLII 167, [1982] 1 SCR 337	25 February 1982	2 March 1982										
Dairy Producers Co-Operative Ltd of Prince Albert v Lyons, 1982 CanLII 168, [1982] 1 SCR 338	22 February 1982	18 March 1982										
Leblanc v The Queen, 1982 CanLII 169, [1982] 1 SCR 344	2 March 1982	18 March 1982										
Lamarche v The Queen, 1982 CanLII 170, [1982] 1 SCR 345	2 March 1982	18 March 1982										
United States of America (District Court) v Royal American Shows, Inc et al, 1982 CanLII 171, [1982] 1 SCR 414	27 January 1982	18 March 1982										
Bryden v Canada Employment and Immigration Commission, 1982 CanLII 172, [1982] 1 SCR 443	3 April 1981	18 March 1982										
Case name	Argued	Decided	Laskin	Martland	Ritchie	Dickson	Beetz	Estey	McIntyre	Chouinard	Lamer	Wilson
Toronto Police Association v Toronto Police Commissioners Board, 1982 CanLII 43, [1982] 1 SCR 451	23 March 1982	23 March 1982	V									
Rubis v Gray Rocks Inn Ltd, 1982 CanLII 17, [1982] 1 SCR 452	11 March 1981	5 April 1982										
R v Geauvreau, 1982 CanLII 44, [1982] 1 SCR 485	23 February 1981	5 April 1982										
Oxford Pendaflex Canada Ltd v Korr Marketing Ltd et al, 1982 CanLII 45, [1982] 1 SCR 494	6 May 1981	5 April 1982										
Hobbins v R, 1982 CanLII 46, [1982] 1 SCR 553	24 March 1982	5 April 1982										
Halpenny Estate v Paddon, 1982 CanLII 47, [1982] 1 SCR 559	13–14 May 1981	5 April 1982										
Cardinal et al v The Queen, 1982 CanLII 173, [1982] 1 SCR 508	31 March – 1 April 1981	5 April 1982										
Gunn v The Queen, 1982 CanLII 174, [1982] 1 SCR 522	17–18 February 1982	5 April 1982										
CRTC v CTV Television Network Ltd et al, 1982 CanLII 175, [1982] 1 SCR 530	16 March 1982	5 April 1982										
Equipements Rocbec Inc et al v Minister of National Revenue, 1982 CanLII 176, [1982] 1 SCR 605	24 February 1982	10 May 1982										
Case name	Argued	Decided	Laskin	Martland	Ritchie	Dickson	Beetz	Estey	McIntyre	Chouinard	Lamer	Wilson
Fee et al v Bradshaw et al, 1982 CanLII 177, [1982] 1 SCR 609	2 March 1982	10 May 1982										
Hanson et al v Johnson et al, 1982 CanLII 178, [1982] 1 SCR 619	29 April 1982	10 May 1982										
Bolduc v Attorney General of Quebec et al, 1982 CanLII 224, [1982] 1 SCR 573	16 February 1982	10 May 1982										
Goodman v Rompkey et al, 1982 CanLII 225, [1982] 1 SCR 589	24 February 1982	10 May 1982										
Teamsters Union v Massicotte, 1982 CanLII 18, [1982] 1 SCR 710	29 March 1982	31 May 1982										
R.E. Lister Ltd v Dunlop Canada Ltd, 1982 CanLII 19, [1982] 1 SCR 726	3–4 November 1981	31 May 1982										
Vetrovec v The Queen, 1982 CanLII 20, [1982] 1 SCR 811	20 May 1981	31 May 1982							" |			
Mahoney v R, 1982 CanLII 21, [1982] 1 SCR 834	30 November 1981	31 May 1982		1	2	3	1	2		1	3	
Barton v Agincourt Football Enterprises Ltd, 1982 CanLII 48, [1982] 1 SCR 666	10 November 1981	31 May 1982										
Paul v The Queen, 1982 CanLII 179, [1982] 1 SCR 621	14 October 1981	31 May 1982										
Case name	Argued	Decided	Laskin	Martland	Ritchie	Dickson	Beetz	Estey	McIntyre	Chouinard	Lamer	Wilson
Goyette v The Queen, 1982 CanLII 180, [1982] 1 SCR 688	12 May 1982	31 May 1982				V						
Ruttan v Ruttan, 1982 CanLII 181, [1982] 1 SCR 690	3 February 1981	31 May 1982										
CATCA v The Queen, 1982 CanLII 182, [1982] 1 SCR 696	2 February 1981	31 May 1982										
Denis-Cossette v Germain, 1982 CanLII 183, [1982] 1 SCR 751	9–10 February 1981	31 May 1982										
R v Brown, 1982 CanLII 184, [1982] 1 SCR 859	10 June 1982	10 June 1982			V							
R v Patrick, 1982 CanLII 2867	18 June 1982	18 June 1982										
Descôteaux et al v Mierzwinski, 1982 CanLII 22, [1982] 1 SCR 860	27–28 October 1981	23 June 1982										
Sweitzer v The Queen, 1982 CanLII 23, [1982] 1 SCR 949	8 February 1982	23 June 1982										
R v Carter, 1982 CanLII 35, [1982] 1 SCR 938	27 January 1982	23 June 1982										
Saieva v R, 1982 CanLII 51, [1982] 1 SCR 897	23 November 1981	23 June 1982										
Case name	Argued	Decided	Laskin	Martland	Ritchie	Dickson	Beetz	Estey	McIntyre	Chouinard	Lamer	Wilson
Carman Construction Ltd v Canadian Pacific Railway Co, 1982 CanLII 52, [1982] 1 SCR 958	12 November 1981	23 June 1982										
Armstrong Cork Canada v Domco Industries Ltd, 1982 CanLII 185, [1982] 1 SCR 907	15–16 December 1981	23 June 1982										
Alberta Union of Provincial Employees, Branch 63, Edmonton, et al v Board of Governors of Olds College, 1982 CanLII 186, [1982] 1 SCR 923	9 February 1982	23 June 1982										
St Luc Hospital v Lafrance et al, 1982 CanLII 187, [1982] 1 SCR 974	24 February 1982	23 June 1982										
Gobeil v Cie H. Fortier et al, 1982 CanLII 188, [1982] 1 SCR 988	18 March 1982	23 June 1982										
Re: Exported Natural Gas Tax, 1982 CanLII 189, [1982] 1 SCR 1004	17–18 June 1981	22–23 June 1982										
Hawrish v Peters et al, 1982 CanLII 190, [1982] 1 SCR 1083	28 February 1982	23 June 1982										
Schavernoch v Foreign Claims Commission et al, 1982 CanLII 191, [1982] 1 SCR 1092	5 May 1982	23 June 1982										
Commission des accidents du travail du Québec v Valade, 1982 CanLII 192, [1982] 1 SCR 1103	20 May 1982	23 June 1982										
Case name	Argued	Decided	Laskin	Martland	Ritchie	Dickson	Beetz	Estey	McIntyre	Chouinard	Lamer	Wilson
Maple Lodge Farms v Government of Canada, 1982 CanLII 24, [1982] 2 SCR 2	4 November 1981	22 July 1982										
R v Abbey, 1982 CanLII 25, [1982] 2 SCR 24	16 December 1981	22 July 1982										
Regional Municipality of Peel v Mackenzie et al, 1982 CanLII 53, [1982] 2 SCR 9	3 December 1981	22 July 1982										
R v Skolnick, 1982 CanLII 54, [1982] 2 SCR 47	1 April 1982	22 July 1982										
Schneider v The Queen, 1982 CanLII 26, [1982] 2 SCR 112	17 December 1981	9 August 1982	1					2				
Insurance Corporation of British Columbia v Heerspink, 1982 CanLII 27, [1982] 2 SCR 145	3 February 1982	9 August 1982										
R in right of Newfoundland v Commission Hydro-Electrique de Québec, 1982 CanLII 28, [1982] 2 SCR 79	29 October – 3 November 1981	9 August 1982										
A.G. Can. v Law Society of BC, 1982 CanLII 29, [1982] 2 SCR 307	25–27 May 1981	9 August 1982										
R v Gardiner, 1982 CanLII 30, [1982] 2 SCR 368	23 November 1981	9 August 1982										
Amato v The Queen, 1982 CanLII 31, [1982] 2 SCR 418	20 May 1981	9 August 1982										
Case name	Argued	Decided	Laskin	Martland	Ritchie	Dickson	Beetz	Estey	McIntyre	Chouinard	Lamer	Wilson
Multiple Access Ltd v McCutcheon, 1982 CanLII 55, [1982] 2 SCR 161	25–26 November 1981	9 August 1982										
Lowden v The Queen, 1982 CanLII 194, [1982] 2 SCR 60	9 February 1982	9 August 1982										
Public Service Alliance of Canada v Francis et al, 1982 CanLII 195, [1982] 2 SCR 72	26–30 November 1981	9 August 1982										
Brisson v The Queen, 1982 CanLII 196, [1982] 2 SCR 227	15 October 1981	9 August 1982	1		1	2	2			2	2	
Newfoundland and Labrador Corporation Ltd et al v Attorney General of Newfoundland, 1982 CanLII 197, [1982] 2 SCR 260	31 October 1981	9 August 1982										
R v Gee, 1982 CanLII 198, [1982] 2 SCR 286	8 February 1982	9 August 1982										
Fok Cheong Shing Investments Co Ltd v Bank of Nova Scotia, 1982 CanLII 57, [1982] 2 SCR 488	3 June 1982	28 September 1982										
A.N. Bail Co v Gingras et al, 1982 CanLII 199, [1982] 2 SCR 475	16 June 1982	28 September 1982										
Petersen v The Queen, 1982 CanLII 200, [1982] 2 SCR 493	16 February 1982	28 September 1982										
R v Melford Developments Inc, 1982 CanLII 201, [1982] 2 SCR 504	1 June 1982	28 September 1982										
Case name	Argued	Decided	Laskin	Martland	Ritchie	Dickson	Beetz	Estey	McIntyre	Chouinard	Lamer	Wilson
Minister of Indian Affairs and Northern Development v Ranville et al, 1982 CanLII 202, [1982] 2 SCR 518	24 March 1982	28 September 1982										
G & N School Bus Service Inc and Minitsos v The Queen, 1982 CanLII 203, [1982] 2 SCR 530	4 October 1982	4 October 1982			V							
R v Hagenlocher, 1982 CanLII 3914, [1982] 2 SCR 531	5 October 1982	5 October 1982	V									
Robar v The Queen, 1982 CanLII 205, [1982] 2 SCR 532	6 October 1982	6 October 1982	V									
Dovenmuehle, Inc v The Rocca Group Inc, 1982 CanLII 206, [1982] 2 SCR 534	7 October 1982	7 October 1982				V						
Bennett v R, 1982 CanLII 58, [1982] 2 SCR 582	13 October 1982	2 November 1982										
Detering v R, 1982 CanLII 59, [1982] 2 SCR 583	14 October 1982	2 November 1982										
Shell Oil Co v Commissioner of Patents, 1982 CanLII 207, [1982] 2 SCR 536	30–31 March 1982	2 November 1982										
Atco Ltd v Calgary Power Ltd, 1982 CanLII 208, [1982] 2 SCR 557	5–6 May 1982	2 November 1982										
Canadian Union of Public Employees et al v The Queen in right of New Brunswick, 1982 CanLII 209, [1982] 2 SCR 587	19 October 1982	2 November 1982										
Case name	Argued	Decided	Laskin	Martland	Ritchie	Dickson	Beetz	Estey	McIntyre	Chouinard	Lamer	Wilson
Arnow v Minister of Employment and Immigration, 1982 CanLII 210, [1982] 2 SCR 603	16 November 1982	16 November 1982	V									
Vachon v The Queen in right of Canada, 1982 CanLII 211, [1982] 2 SCR 604	17 November 1982	17 November 1982			V							
Beson v Director of Child Welfare (Nfld), 1982 CanLII 32, [1982] 2 SCR 716	21 October 1982	23 November 1982										
St Peter's Evangelical Lutheran Church v Ottawa, 1982 CanLII 60, [1982] 2 SCR 616	1 April 1982	23 November 1982										
Durham Regional Police Association v Durham Regional Board of Police Commissioners, 1982 CanLII 61, [1982] 2 SCR 709	2 November 1982	23 November 1982										
R v MacDougall, 1982 CanLII 212, [1982] 2 SCR 605	18 February 1982	23 November 1982										
Corpex (1977) Inc v The Queen in right of Canada, 1982 CanLII 213, [1982] 2 SCR 643	24–25 March 1982	23 November 1982										
R v Dunn, 1982 CanLII 214, [1982] 2 SCR 677	4 May 1982	23 November 1982										
Smallwood v Sparling, 1982 CanLII 215, [1982] 2 SCR 686	11 May 1982	23 November 1982										
Spek v The Queen, 1982 CanLII 209, [1982] 2 SCR 587	24 November 1982	25 November 1982										
Case name	Argued	Decided	Laskin	Martland	Ritchie	Dickson	Beetz	Estey	McIntyre	Chouinard	Lamer	Wilson
Leatherdale v Leatherdale, 1982 CanLII 62, [1982] 2 SCR 743	22 March 1982	6 December 1982										
Marvco Colour Research Ltd v Harris, 1982 CanLII 63, [1982] 2 SCR 774	3 November 1982	6 December 1982										
Re: Objection by Quebec to a Resolution to amend the Constitution, 1982 CanLII 219, [1982] 2 SCR 793	14–15 June 1982	6 December 1982										
Innisfil (Corporation of the Township) v Corporation of the Township of Vespra et al, 1982 CanLII 193, [1982] 2 SCR 1107	9 December 1982	9 December 1982						(Note: Order varying Innisfil Township v Vespra Township, 1981 CanLII 59, [1981] 2 SCR 145 (28 May 1981))				
Graat v The Queen, 1982 CanLII 33, [1982] 2 SCR 819	12 October 1982	21 December 1982										
Roberval Express v Transport Drivers Union, 1982 CanLII 34, [1982] 2 SCR 888	20 October 1982	21 December 1982										
Capital Regional District v Concerned Citizens of British Columbia et al, 1982 CanLII 220, [1982] 2 SCR 842	25 November 1982	21 December 1982										
Kwiatkowsky v Minister of Employment and Immigration, 1982 CanLII 221, [1982] 2 SCR 856	13 May 1982	21 December 1982										
Travelers Insurance Co of Canada v Corriveau et al, 1982 CanLII 222, [1982] 2 SCR 866	18 March 1982	21 December 1982										
Hammerling v The Queen, 1982 CanLII 223, [1982] 2 SCR 905	5 October 1982	21 December 1982					1			1	2	
