= Attorney General v. Hitchcock =

- Court: Exchequer Court
- Decided: 10 June 1847
- Citation: (1847) I Exch. 91, 154 E.R. 38
- Transcript: Full text of judgment

Keywords
- Hitchcock Rule, Collateral Evidence

Attorney General v. Hitchcock (1847) 154 E.R. 38 establishes the common law "Hitchcock Rule" regarding impeachment of a witness and establishing a test for a collateral matter.

== Case Summary ==
Hitchcock was charged with the illegal use of an untaxed cistern to make malt by the Attorney General.

== Hitchcock Rule ==
The Hitchcock Rule (also known as the "Collateral Rule") is a common law rule forbidding the introduction of extrinsic evidence to contradict a witness on a collateral matter. That is, impeachment of a witness as to a collateral fact can only be accomplished by intrinsic methods such as questioning.

Although this test is not found in the Federal Rules of Evidence explicitly it has been imported from the common law under rules 403 and 611.
