= R v Lifchus =

- Supreme Court of Canada

Hearing: May 29, 1997 Judgment: September 18, 1997
- Full case name: Her Majesty The Queen v. William Lifchus
- Citations: [1997] 3 SCR 320

Court membership
- Chief Justice: Antonio Lamer; Puisne Justices: Gérard La Forest, Claire L'Heureux-Dubé, John Sopinka, Charles Gonthier, Peter Cory, Beverley McLachlin, Frank Iacobucci, John C. Major

Reasons given
- Majority: Cory J, joined by Lamer CJ and Sopinka, McLachlin, Iacobucci and Major JJ
- Concurrence: L'Heureux-Dubé J, joined by La Forest and Gonthier JJ

R v Lifchus, [1997] 3 SCR 320 is a leading Supreme Court of Canada decision on the legal basis of the "beyond a reasonable doubt" standard for criminal law. Cory J outlined several core principles of the reasonable doubt standard and provided a list of points that must be explained to a jury when they are to consider the standard.

== Background ==
William Lifchus was a stockbroker who misrepresented the value of a bond in his personal margin account to his employer, defrauding it of a substantial amount of money. He was charged with fraud and theft of over $1,000.

Lifchus was convicted of fraud before a jury. He appealed on the ground that the jury was misinstructed about the standard of "proof beyond a reasonable doubt".

There were four issues before the Court: 1) Must a trial judge provide the jury with an explanation of the expression "reasonable doubt"? 2) If so, how should this concept be explained to the jury? 3) Did the charge in this case amount to a misdirection on the meaning of "reasonable doubt"? 4) If the charge in this case was insufficient, ought this Court give effect to the curative proviso set out at section 686(1)(b)(iii) of the Criminal Code?

== Opinion of the Court ==
The Court found in favour of Lifchus and ordered a new trial. The opinion of the Court was written by Cory J with a minority opinion by L'Heureux-Dubé J.

Cory used the case as an opportunity to describe the significance of the "reasonable doubt" standard. He described it as a fundamental principle in criminal justice and was intertwined with the presumption of innocence. As such, the description of the meaning to the jury must be done very carefully.

=== Guidelines ===
Cory provides a series of principles upon which a trial judge must formulate their definition of "reasonable doubt" to a jury.

It should be explained that:

- the standard of proof beyond a reasonable doubt is inextricably intertwined with that principle fundamental to all criminal trials, the presumption of innocence;
- the burden of proof rests on the prosecution throughout the trial and never shifts to the accused;
- a reasonable doubt is not a doubt based upon sympathy or prejudice;
- rather, it is based upon reason and common sense;
- it is logically connected to the evidence or absence of evidence;
- it does not involve proof to an absolute certainty; it is not proof beyond any doubt nor is it an imaginary or frivolous doubt; and
- more is required than proof that the accused is probably guilty -- a jury which concludes only that the accused is probably guilty must acquit.

On the other hand, certain references to the required standard of proof should be avoided. For example:

- describing the term "reasonable doubt" as an ordinary expression which has no special meaning in the criminal law context;
- inviting jurors to apply to the task before them the same standard of proof that they apply to important, or even the most important, decisions in their own lives;
- equating proof "beyond a reasonable doubt" to proof "to a moral certainty";
- qualifying the word "doubt" with adjectives other than "reasonable", such as "serious", "substantial" or "haunting", which may mislead the jury; and
- instructing jurors that they may convict if they are "sure" that the accused is guilty, before providing them with a proper definition as to the meaning of the words "beyond a reasonable doubt".

== Aftermath ==
The later cases of R v Bisson, [1998] 1 SCR 306 and R v Starr, [2000] 2 SCR 144 elaborate on the principles established in Lifchus.
