= R v Khelawon =

- Supreme Court of Canada

Hearing: December 16, 2005 Judgment: December 14, 2006
- Full case name: Her Majesty The Queen v Ramnarine Khelawon
- Citations: 2006 SCC 57
- Docket No.: 30857
- Prior history: Appeal from Ontario Court of Appeal
- Ruling: Appeal dismissed

Court membership
- Chief Justice: Beverley McLachlin; Puisne Justices: Michel Bastarache, Ian Binnie, Louis LeBel, Marie Deschamps, Morris Fish, Rosalie Abella, Louise Charron

Reasons given
- Unanimous reasons by: Charron J

R v Khelawon [2006] 2 S.C.R. 787, 2006 SCC 57 is a leading decision by the Supreme Court of Canada on the principled approach to hearsay evidence.

== Facts ==
Ramnarine Khelawon was accused of aggravated assault, uttering a death threat, assault causing bodily harm, and assault with a weapon. The offences involved five residents of a nursing home, in which Khelawon worked as the manager. Four of the alleged victims died before trial from unrelated causes. The fifth was found incompetent to testify. Two of the deceased complainants, Mr. Skupien and Mr. Dinino, had given videotaped statements to police, concerning the alleged incidents.

Since the declarants were deceased, the videotaped statements became hearsay, and the issue for the trial judge was whether or not the statements were reliable enough to be admitted.

== Courts below ==
The trial judge, Grossi J, "...held that the hearsay statements from each of the complainants were sufficiently reliable to be admitted in evidence, based in large part on the 'striking' similarity between them". Khelawon was convicted.

The Court of Appeal for Ontario allowed Khelawon's appeal. Rosenberg JA (Armstrong JA concurring) rejected the statements, while Blair JA (dissenting) would have admitted the statements and dismissed the appeal. The Crown sought leave to appeal to the SCC to restore Khelawon's convictions. Leave to appeal was allowed in respect of Mr. Skupien's statement, but denied in respect of Mr. Dinino's statement.

== Supreme Court of Canada ==
Charron J delivered the SCC's unanimous decision. The Court held that Mr. Skupien's statement was inadmissible, as it was not sufficiently reliable. In delivering the Court's decision, Charron J rendered a major alteration to the threshold reliability branch of the principled approach, effectively overruling this portion of R v Starr. In particular, the bar Starr erected on the use of corroborative evidence in the threshold reliability assessment no longer applies. Instead of categorizing reliability factors into discreet, non-mutually exclusive threshold and ultimate stages, courts should now "adopt a more functional approach... and focus on the particular dangers raised by the hearsay evidence sought to be introduced and on those attributes or circumstances relied upon by the proponent to overcome those dangers". In effect, trial judges may now consider evidence going beyond the circumstances under which the statement was made at the threshold reliability stage, which includes corroborative and/or conflicting evidence.

== See also ==
- List of Supreme Court of Canada cases (McLachlin Court)
- List of Supreme Court of Canada cases
- R v Smith (1992)
- R v Khan (1990)
