= Trial advocacy =

Improving effectiveness of advocates

Trial advocacy is the branch of knowledge concerned with making attorneys and other advocates more effective in trial proceedings. Trial advocacy is an essential trade skill for litigators and is taught in law schools and continuing legal education programs. It may also be taught in primary, secondary, and undergraduate schools, usually as a mock trial elective.

The skills of trial advocacy can be broken into two categories: skills that accomplish individual tasks (tactical skills) such as selecting jurors, delivering opening statements and closing arguments, and examining witnesses, and those skills that integrate the individual actions to achieve greater effects and to drive unfolding events toward the advocate's desired outcome (strategy).

Most law school trial advocacy courses focus on tactical skills, though some integrate basic strategic planning methods. Some academics have expressed disfavor with advanced strategic techniques because of the imbalance they create, especially against attorneys who are unaware of them. Proponents of advanced strategic techniques argue that these methods are the only effective means to counter the already-existing imbalances in the system, as between indigent defendants and the state, and between working-class plaintiffs and well-resourced, wealthy corporations.

== History ==
Like most legal skills, trial advocacy evolved through the apprenticeship and practice of attorneys. Even after 1900 (when the education of attorneys shifted to law schools,) most law schools offered little education in advocacy. In 1969, in response to criticism within the judicial system that law schools were not properly preparing attorneys for trial practice, a group of lawyers and law professors combined to form the National Institute for Trial Advocacy (NITA). Since then, many law schools have added or improved their instruction in trial advocacy, and numerous Continuing Legal Education organizations have offered classes surveying the subject area, and on specific topics within the field. Nearly one dozen law schools in the United States offer Master of Law (LL.M.) degrees in trial advocacy. Trial advocacy originally focused on individual actions within the trial, proposing improved juror selection, argument delivery, and direct and cross-examination methods. However, in the 1970s, NITA advanced the concepts of theme and theory as methods of integrating the various components into a cohesive whole. More recently, litigation strategy has blossomed with the importation of concepts from economic game theory, complexity theory, Gestalt psychology, and the application of maneuver warfare as a means not only of integrating the various actions within the trial into a comprehensive case but also as a means of gaining a decisive advantage over opposing counsel.

== Trial practice or advocacy courses ==
Trial practice or trial advocacy is an upper-level course offered in most American law schools designed to teach future litigators the fine points of presenting a case to a judge and jury. Unlike most law school courses, a trial practice class has very little discussion of substantive law, and is focused on the practical application of public speaking, narrative, and using body language to communicate a particular set of events to the triers of fact. Trial practice also contains elements of strategy, teaching students how to decide the order in which witnesses should testify, when exhibits should be introduced, and how to trap opposing witnesses into giving testimony that damages their side.

Evidence is the area of substantive law most reinforced by a trial practice course, with students learning how to apply evidence law in a real-life setting, including learning when they can object to questions asked of witnesses, what objections to raise, and how to effectively present objections.

Trial practice courses may have a classroom component. Also, trial practice courses will usually have an ongoing "lab" component where an attorney will instruct a small group of students on trial skills and assist them in honing their craft. Often, students practice against one another in mock trials throughout the course; for example, students may be divided into groups of 4, with each group containing two teams who practice against one another in mock trials. Rather than a final exam, the course may culminate in a mock trial with volunteer "witnesses".

== Topics ==
The topics commonly encompassed within Trial Advocacy are:

=== Jury selection or voir dire ===
The selection of jurors that will be receptive to the argument the attorney intends to make.

=== Opening statement ===
Presenting a non-argumentative overview of what the jury will see, often in the context of the attorney's theme, theory, and story.

=== Direct examination ===
Eliciting evidence from one's witnesses through non-leading questions. Because studies have shown that people best remember the first and the most recent (last) information heard (methods referred to as primacy and recency), the preferred method is to start with an engaging and favorable topic, move through more mundane matters, and to finish on a strong, favorable point.

=== Cross examination ===
Working with witnesses offered by the opposing party who may be hostile or uncooperative.

=== Closing argument ===
Using argument to create within the jurors a perception of what they have seen and heard that influences them to find in favor of the attorney's client.

=== Persuasion ===
The general principles that enable an advocate to make the jurors more receptive to his or her claims.

=== Mock trial ===
In mock trials, students take responsibility for the prosecution/plaintiff or defense case in a trial presented using fabricated evidence, and role-players as witnesses and faculty or volunteers as judge or jury. It evaluates the participants' skills in argument, evidence handling, and examination of witnesses but omits jury selection and strategic matters. Mock trial differs from moot court in that moot court practices appellate argument and so involves no handling of witnesses or evidence, but instead is an exercise in legal research and oral advocacy.

=== Basic trial strategy ===
The means of organizing a case into a clear and complete presentation.

- Case Diagrams: The attorney charts the elements they intend to prove (or attack) and the evidence supporting each. These ensures the case is comprehensively addressed.
- Theme and Theory: The theme is a sound bite that captures the emotional appeal of the case, and the theory is an explanation of events. These serve as strategic focal points, allowing individual actions (opening, examination of each witness, etc.) to be united with a common focus and in a way that clarifies and reinforces the perception of the case the attorney wants the jury or judge to adopt.

=== Advanced trial strategy ===
The means of organizing a case to maximize the combined impact of every element and to overwhelm or outmaneuver the opposing counsel while presenting a clear, decisive argument to the jury (or judge, in the case of bench trials).

Advanced strategic skills, based upon psychology and military maneuver philosophy, are generally learned outside the classroom, as few law schools teach them. In fact, academics have criticized advanced strategic techniques for tipping verdicts through means unrelated to the merits of the case. For example, these techniques may cause an unfamiliar advocate to take actions that unwittingly undermine his client's interests. There is particular concern regarding the use of advanced strategic techniques by prosecutors, who already wield the substantial power of the state against often poorly resourced defendants.

The counterargument is that strategy can correct already-existing imbalances in the justice system, such as when inexperienced advocates must face highly experienced ones, when small firms oppose large ones, and when poor clients must litigate their rights against wealthy ones. Under the current system, without a well-developed strategy, a small firm with an impoverished client stands almost no chance of success against a large firm with more significant resources, regardless of the case's merits.

- Maneuver strategy: An alternative to arguing the evidence or the law, maneuver strategies pursue solutions such as redirecting the focus of the trial, reshaping the way events are perceived, or disrupting or surprising the opposing counsel, rendering him ineffective at responding to unfolding events. While these methods are practiced widely, even by advocates not educated in strategy, some object to this as improper even when practiced ethically, as it subordinates the importance of the evidence and the law in determining a trial's outcome. One proponent of maneuver strategy, however, has noted that regardless of whether the attorney intends to leverage the tools of maneuver strategy, the attorney must understand the methods, or they will be ill-equipped to identify and counter them.
- Gestalt psychology: This branch of psychology focuses on how things are perceived as a whole instead of how individual components appear. It aids in ensuring the jury (or judge in bench trials) perceives events as the attorney desires. It also offers a way of shaping how witnesses and opposing counsel will perceive the problems an attorney raises for them during the trial. When coupled with game theory, shaping perception allows an attorney to influence or shape the hostile witness or counsel's actions.
- Game theory: Game theory offers models of how people make decisions. In trial practice, game theory is useful in predicting witnesses' likely actions when presented with a decision. Because decisions are framed according to how they perceive a situation, when game theory is coupled with Gestalt psychology, attorneys can present problems to witnesses or opposing counsel to increase the likelihood of them making decisions about their responses that improve the attorney's strategic position.
- Lines of effort: In the way a case diagram matches evidence to elements, the line of effort matches actions to specific effects the attorney intends to the various results that achieve their goal.
