= R v Baker =

- Court: Court of Appeal of New Zealand
- Decided: 20 April 1989
- Citation: [1989] 1 NZLR 738

Court membership
- Judges sitting: Cooke P, Casey and Ellis JJ

Keywords
- Evidence (law), Criminal law, Hearsay

R v Baker [1989] 1 NZLR 738 was a decision of the Court of Appeal of New Zealand concerning the admissibility of hearsay evidence in a criminal trial. The judgment of President Sir Robin Cooke's created a common law exception to the rule against hearsay evidence in situations where the evidence is reliable and the witness unavailable. This principle was incorporated into the codification of the hearsay rule in the Evidence Act 2006.

== Background ==
Dean Baker had been accused of and committed to trial for the murder and rape of his wife who lived apart from him. Mrs. Baker had been shot through the forehead and found dead on the bedroom floor of her Napier flat. There was tape and cords on the bed and evidence that Mrs. Baker had had recent sexual intercourse. The accused had also been shot in the head.

The accused's statement to police was that, "on the night before the shootings she had telephoned him and asked him to come round in the morning to shoot some stray cats. That accordingly he went there with the rifle at about 7 am. That she then invited him to have intercourse and requested to be tied to the bed. That after those events occurred, she being partly undressed, he untied her and she dressed again, but that then she picked up the rifle and shot both him and herself".

The prosecution wished to introduce into the trial hearsay evidence from several witnesses that they believed would help establish that, "the deceased was frightened of her husband and was most unlikely to have invited him to her flat to shoot stray cats". In a pre-trial ruling, Justice Gallen ruled the evidence inadmissible as hearsay evidence and not covered by the 'state of mind' exception confirmed by the House of Lords in R v Blastland [1986] AC 41. The Crown appealed. The accused cross-appealed on Gallen J's ruling allowing hearsay evidence of his attitude towards Mrs Baker to be admitted.

== Judgments ==
The Court unanimously allowed the Crown's appeal and dismissed the cross-appeal. Justice Ellis concurred with Cooke P and Casey J.

=== Cooke P ===
In allowing the Crown's appeal President Cooke famously held,

At least in a case such as the present it may be more helpful to go straight to basics and ask whether in the particular circumstances it is reasonably safe and of sufficient relevance to admit the evidence notwithstanding the dangers against which the hearsay rule guards. Essentially the whole question is one of degree, … If the evidence is admitted the Judge may and where the facts so require should advise the jury to consider carefully both whether they are satisfied that the witness can be relied on as accurately reporting the statement and whether the maker of the statement may have exaggerated or spoken loosely or in some cases even lied. The fact that they have not had the advantage of seeing that person in the witness box and that he or she has not been tested on oath and in cross-examination can likewise be underlined by the Judge as far as necessary.

=== Casey J ===
Justice Casey reasoned that the Crown's evidence should be admitted on the basis of the 'state of mind' exception to the hearsay rule which had recently been confirmed in a judgment of Lord Bridge in R v Blastland [1986] AC 41,

"It is, of course, elementary that statements made to a witness by a third party are not excluded by the hearsay rule when they are put in evidence solely to prove the state of mind either of the maker of the statement or the person to whom it was made. What a person said or heard said may well be the best and most direct evidence of that person's state of mind. This principle can only apply, however, when the state of mind evidenced by the statement is either itself directly in issue at the trial or is of direct and immediate relevance to an issue which arises at the trial."

In contrast to Gallen J who had seen Mrs Baker's statements of fear at her husband as "rather on the side of establishing a factual situation than of indicating a continuing state of mind"; Justice Casey believed,

"By itself, the fact that the deceased did not invite her husband around to shoot cats advances the Crown case no further, if this is what the jury infers from the evidence of her state of mind. However, that conclusion rebuts the only innocent explanation he has so far given for his visit with a gun and ammunition. Accordingly the evidence of her state of mind becomes directly relevant to the issue of his intentions towards her when he arrived and at the time of the shooting, which appears to have occurred not long afterwards."

== Significance ==
The authors of Cross on Evidence describe the decision in Baker as, "...tantamount to a qualified judicial abrogation of the hearsay rule when evidence is sufficiently cogent and it is thought “reasonably safe” in all the circumstances to admit it, providing that it is evidence which in “common sense and justice most people would think ought to be admitted”.

Elisabeth McDonald of the Victoria University Faculty of Law noted, "The test proposed by Cooke P in Baker, if read as a general discretion to admit hearsay, having significant implications for oral hearsay offered in criminal cases, was also the first articulation of such a test in the appellate courts of Anglo-American common law jurisdictions."

Beginning in the late 1980s the Law Commission began to review the area of evidence law with an eye to codifying it. The decision of Baker proved of lasting influence and the test of reliability was incorporated within the general test for the admissibility of hearsay evidence contained in section 18 of the Evidence Act 2006.
