= Suggestive question =

Linguistic expression

A suggestive question is a question that implies that a certain answer should be given in response, or falsely presents a presupposition in the question as accepted fact. Such a question distorts the memory thereby tricking the person into answering in a specific way that might or might not be true or consistent with their actual feelings, and can be deliberate or unintentional. For example, the phrasing "Don't you think this was wrong?" is more suggestive than "Do you think this was wrong?" despite the difference of only one word. The former may subtly pressure the respondent into responding "yes", whereas the latter is far more direct. Repeated questions can make people think their first answer is wrong and lead them to change their answer, or it can cause people to continuously answer until the interrogator gets the exact response that they desire. The diction used by the interviewer can also be an influencing factor to the response given by the interrogated individual.

Experimental research by psychologist Elizabeth Loftus has established that trying to answer such questions can create confabulation in eyewitnesses. For example, participants in an experiment may all view the same video clip of a car crash. Participants are assigned at random in one of two groups. The participants in the first group are asked "How fast was the car moving when it passed by the stop sign?" The participants in the other group are asked a similar question that does not refer to a stop sign. Later, the participants from the first group are more likely to remember seeing a stop sign in the video clip, even though there was in fact no such sign, raising serious questions about the validity of information elicited through poorly phrased questions during eyewitness testimony.

== Types ==
=== Direct questions ===
Direct questions lead to one word answers when explanations are sometimes needed. This could include questions like "Do you get it?" and "Where did it happen?"

=== Repeated questions ===
Repeated questioning elicit certain types of answers. Repeated questions make people think their first answer was wrong, lead them to change their answer, or cause people to keep answering until the interrogator gets the exact response that they desire. Elizabeth Loftus states that errors in answers are dramatically reduced if a question is only asked once.

=== Forced choice questions ===
Yes/no or forced choice questions, like "Should we convict this murderer?", force people to choose between two choices when the answer could be neither of the choices. This generates more "interviewer-talks" moments, where the interviewer is talking and controlling most of the interview. This type of question is also known as a false dilemma.

=== Presumptuous questions ===
Presumptuous questions can either be balanced or unbalanced. Unbalanced questions ask questions only from the point of view of one side of an argument. For example, an interrogator might ask, "Do you favor the death penalty for persons convicted of murder?" This question assumes that the person's only point of view in the situation is that a person who is convicted must either get the death penalty or not. The second type of presumptuous question is a "balanced question." This is when the interrogator uses opposite questions to make the witness believe that the question is balanced when the reality is that it is not. For example, the interrogator would ask, "Do you favor life in prison, without the possibility of parole?" This type of question may seem balanced when in reality it is still influencing the person to discuss life in prison and no other choice.

=== Confirmatory questions ===
Confirmatory questioning leads to answers that can only support a certain point. Here, the interviewer forces the person to make sure his or her answers make them out to be extroverted or introverted. If they want them to look extroverted they would ask questions like "How do you make a party more fun?" and "When are you talkative?" If they want the person to look introverted they ask questions like "Have you ever been left out of a group?" or "Can you be more hyper sometimes?".

== Research ==
Considerable attention has been devoted to suggestive questions and their effects. Experimental research by Elizabeth Loftus, an American psychologist and an expert on human memory, has established that trying to answer such questions can create confabulation in eyewitnesses. Loftus conducted an experiment where participants all viewed the same video clip of a car crash. Participants were then assigned at random to one of two groups. Group one was asked, "How fast was the car moving when it passed by the stop sign?" The participants in the other group were asked a similar question that did not refer to a stop sign. The results showed participants from the first group were more likely to remember seeing a stop sign in the video clip, even though there was in fact no such sign. Loftus stated that everyone is affected by suggestive questioning, and it comes from environmental factors instead of innate factors.

William S. Cassel, a professor at the University of New Orleans conducted an experiment that was performed on Kindergarten, Grade 2, Grade 4, and adult subjects. They were required to view a brief video of two children arguing about the use of a bicycle. One week later subjects were asked for their free recall of the events in the video. It was then followed by sets of hierarchically arranged, increasingly suggestive questions that suggested a correct (positive-leading), an incorrect (misleading), or no specific (unbiased-leading) answer. The final level of questioning for each item was a three-alternative multiple-choice question. Correct free recall varied with age, with the kindergarten and Grade 2 children generally following the lead of the first-level questions more so than the older subjects. Older children were as accurate as adults in responding to questions about the central items, but not so for non-central items. Developmental differences were found in responses to repeated suggestive questioning, with kindergarten children following misleading questions and changing answers more often than older subjects. On the final multiple-choice questions, kindergarten children were able to provide the correct answer as often as they had to the initial questions, despite intervening errors.

Loftus and John Palmer developed the Misinformation Effect. It describes participants witnessing an accident whose responses change if questions are worded differently. They found that people tend to exaggerate what they really saw. Twenty-five percent of the participants claimed they saw broken glass because the word "smashed" instead of "hit" was used.

== Professionals at risk of using suggestive questions ==
=== Interrogators and police ===
Unethical or unskilled police officers can use suggestive questioning in interrogation rooms; such interrogators use different techniques and types of questions in order to get people to confess: they use 'response framing' when getting people to confess falsely. This is when they purposely limit certain answers and suggest others. For example, they would ask someone if they were at the house at 1, 2, or 3 o'clock, forcing them to think it had to have been one of those choices. It causes people to recall things from the prompt instead of their memories. Also, interrogators use 'stereotype induction', which is when they tell the witness only negative characteristics of the alleged perpetrator. Part of stereotype induction is the incriminating condition where everything the witness says is labeled as 'bad'. The detective would slightly shake his head or tell the witness to try again. This contrasts with another interrogating option of using a 'neutral interview' technique, which includes both the bad and good aspects of the perpetrator.

The more time interrogators take to ask witnesses about an incident, the more the memory of the event would fade and people would forget what really happened. Then, after the memory is retrieved, some aspects are reconstructed which causes error. Not even confidence in what witnesses think they saw can be correlated with accurate memory. According to the psychologist Philip Zimbardo, "Misinformed individuals can come to believe the misinformation in which they feel confidence".

=== Therapists ===
Some therapists are at risk of using suggestive questions on clients while discussing the matter of past traumatic events. Sigmund Freud's definition of repressed memory is "the mind's conscious and unconscious avoidance of unpleasant wishes, thoughts, and memories." However, there has been very little evidence of this type of memory. Some therapists claim that repression causes people to forget frightful events of sexual or physical abuse as a psychological defense. Through improperly phrased interviewing questions, a therapist can convince their client to agree that there is such a thing as repressed memory, and therefore abuse had to have occurred, but the patient just does not remember it. Repetitive questions change clients' answers from a reluctant "perhaps" to a definite "for sure". The use of suggestive questioning by therapists changes perceptions and can cause entire memories to be created.

== See also ==
- Closed-ended question
- Framing (social sciences)
- Leading question
- Loaded question
- Open-ended question
- Push poll
