= Push poll =

Use of polling to manipulate public opinion

A push poll is an interactive marketing technique, most commonly employed during political campaigning, in which a person or organization attempts to manipulate or alter prospective voters' views under the guise of conducting an opinion poll. In a push poll, large numbers of voters are contacted with little effort made to collect and analyze their response data. Instead, the push poll is a form of telemarketing-based propaganda and rumor-mongering masquerading as an opinion poll. Push polls may rely on innuendo, or information gleaned from opposition research on the political opponent of the interests behind the poll.

Generally, push polls are viewed as a form of negative campaigning. Indeed, the term is commonly (and confusingly) used in a broader sense to refer to legitimate polls that aim to test negative political messages. Future usage of the term will determine whether the strict or broad definition becomes the most favored, but in all such polls, the pollster asks leading questions or suggestive questions that "push" the interviewee toward adopting an unfavourable response toward the political candidate or issue in question.

Legislation in Australia's Northern Territory defined push-polling as any activity conducted as part of a telephone call made, or a meeting held, during the election period for an election, that: (a) is, or appears to be, a survey (for example, a telephone opinion call or telemarketing call); and (b) is intended to influence an elector in deciding their vote.

Push polling has been condemned by the American Association of Political Consultants and the American Association for Public Opinion Research.

== Origin ==
Richard Nixon pioneered push polling. In his very first campaign, a 1946 run for the U.S. House against incumbent Jerry Voorhis, voters throughout the district reported receiving telephone calls that began: "This is a friend of yours, but I can't tell you who I am. Did you know that Jerry Voorhis is a communist?" (Voorhis was not)—at which point the caller hung up. A citizen reported that she worked for the Nixon campaign for $9 ($100 in 2025) a day in a telephone-bank room where the attack calls were made. Nixon later admitted he knew Voorhis was not a communist, but the important thing was to win.

== Types and their effects ==
The mildest forms of push polling are designed merely to remind voters of a particular issue. For instance, a push poll might ask respondents to rank candidates based on their support of an issue in order to get voters thinking about that issue.

Many push polls are negative attacks on candidates. These often contain suggestions not stated as facts. They ask questions such as "If you knew that Candidate Smith was being investigated for corruption, would you be more likely to vote for him or less likely?" The question does not say that any investigation has taken place, so it is not a lie, but it puts in the respondent's mind the idea that Candidate Smith may be corrupt.

True push polls tend to be very short, with only a handful of questions, to maximise the number of calls that can be made. Any data obtained (if used at all) is secondary in importance to the resulting negative effect on the targeted candidate. Legitimate polls are often used by candidates to test potential messages. They frequently ask about either positive and negative statements about any or all major candidates in an election and always include demographic questions.

Push polls' main advantage is that they are an effective way to malign an opponent ("pushing" voters toward a predetermined point of view) while avoiding direct responsibility for the distorted or false information suggested (but not directly alleged) in the push poll. They are risky for the same reason: if credible evidence emerges that the polls were directly ordered by a campaign or candidate, it could do serious damage to that campaign. Push polls are also relatively expensive, having a far higher cost per voter than radio or television commercials. Consequently, push polls are most used in elections with fewer voters, such as party primaries, or in close elections where a relatively small change in votes can make the difference between victory or defeat.

== Examples ==
=== Australia ===
In March 2011, The Daily Telegraph reported that the Australian Labor Party was referred to the New South Wales Electoral Commission after it was alleged to have used "push polling" in Newcastle to discredit independent candidate John Stuart Tate. Labor Party officials employed a market research firm to conduct the polling, telling voters that Tate was the Labor mayor of Newcastle when in fact he was not. It has been suggested that Labor was worried its brand was so damaged in one of its traditional seats that it branded the popular independent as one of its own to discredit him. Labor polling firm Fieldworks Market Research admitted to the Telegraph that the script used when calling voters branded Tate a "Labor" candidate, but said the Labor Party provided the script. It is not publicly known whether the Electoral Commission responded to this referral.

=== United States ===
Political consultant Lee Atwater was well known for using push-polling among his aggressive campaign tactics. He apologized for this in later life.

George W. Bush used push polls in his 1994 bid for Texas Governor against incumbent Ann Richards. Callers asked voters "whether they would be more or less likely to vote for Governor Richards if they knew that lesbians dominated on her staff".

In the 2000 United States Republican Party primaries, it was alleged that Bush's campaign used push polling against Senator John McCain. Voters in South Carolina reportedly were asked, "Would you be more likely or less likely to vote for John McCain for president if you knew he had fathered an illegitimate black child?" This hypothetical question seemed like a suggestion, although without substance and the McCains had a young adopted Bangladeshi daughter. It was heard by thousands of primary voters.

In the 2008 presidential election, Jewish voters in several states were targeted by various push polls that linked Barack Obama to various anti-Israel positions. For example, various push polls suggested that Obama was a Muslim; that his church was anti-American and anti-Israel; that he often met pro-Palestinian leaders in Chicago (and had met PLO leaders); that a Hamas leader had endorsed him; and that he had called for a summit of Muslim nations excluding Israel if elected president. The Jewish Council for Education and Research, an organization that endorsed Obama, denounced the push polls as disinformation and lies.

Amid widespread controversy over the Trump administration's executive order restricting immigration from the Middle East, the Republican Party sent out a poll to supporters on February 17, 2017, titled "Mainstream Media Accountability", which included such questions as "Do you believe that the media unfairly reported on President Trump’s executive order temporarily restricting people entering our country from nations compromised by radical Islamic terrorism?" and "Were you aware that a poll was released revealing that a majority of Americans actually supported President Trump's temporary restriction executive order?" Trump's campaign used similar tactics throughout the 2020 United States presidential election.

=== United Kingdom ===
In "The Ministerial Broadcast", a 1986 episode of the satirical television program Yes, Prime Minister, the Prime Minister's Cabinet Secretary, Sir Humphrey Appleby (portrayed by Nigel Hawthorne), demonstrates push polling to the Prime Minister's Principal Private Secretary, Bernard Woolley (portrayed by Derek Fowlds), with respect to the policy of reintroducing National Service:

Questions asked by the pollster
In support	In opposition
1. "Are you worried about the number of young people without jobs?" 2. "Are you worried about the rise in crime among teenagers?" 3. "Do you think there's a lack of discipline in our comprehensive schools?" 4. "Do you think young people would welcome some authority and leadership in their lives?" 5. "Do you think young people respond well to a challenge?" 6. "Would you be in favour of reintroducing national service?"	1. "Are you worried about the danger of war?" 2. "Are you worried about the growth of armaments?" 3. "Do you think there's a danger in giving young people guns and teaching them how to kill?" 4. "Do you think it's wrong to force people to take up arms against their will?" 5. "Would you be opposed to the reintroduction of national service?"

Appleby demonstrates that, with Woolley answering in the affirmative to the leading questions, he would find it difficult to argue against the desired policy. Appleby then alleges that disreputable polling companies would discard the leading questions and provide only the results for the main question.

In 2024, polling firm Ipsos released two 1,000-respondent polls demonstrating that, if the first set of questions was asked, the reintroduction of national service had a 45% to 38% margin of support, whereas if the second set of questions was asked, reintroduction was opposed by a margin of 48% to 34%. Ipsos's polling was meant to demonstrate the danger of push-polling—especially in an election year—and promote the resiliency of British Polling Council rules that seek to prevent it.

== Legal actions ==
The parliament of the Northern Territory (Australia) has legislated to restrict push polling in that, during an election, the caller is required to identify his/her name and address.

The state legislature has attempted to restrict the practice in New Hampshire.

== See also ==
- Astroturfing
- Attack ad
- Dog-whistle politics
- Fear mongering
- Smear campaign
- Wedge issue – Wedge politics
