= OODA loop =

Observe–orient–decide–act cycle

Diagram of the OODA loop

The OODA loop (observe, orient, decide, act loop) is a decision-making model developed by United States Air Force Colonel John Boyd in the early 1970s. He applied the concept to the combat operations process, often at the operational level during military campaigns. The loop includes continuous collection of feedback and observations. This enables late commitment, which is an important element of agility. This is in contrast to the PDCA (plan–do–check–act) cycle which requires early commitment. It is often applied to understand commercial operations and learning processes. The approach explains how agility can overcome raw power in dealing with human opponents.

== Use in law and business ==
The OODA loop has become an important concept in litigation, business, law enforcement, management education, military strategy and cyber security, and cyberwarfare. According to Boyd, decision-making occurs in an iterative cycle of "observe, orient, decide, act". An entity (whether an individual or an organization) that can process this cycle quickly, observing and reacting to unfolding events more rapidly and/or more effectively than an opponent, can thereby get inside the opponent's decision cycle and gain the advantage.

Jamie Dimon, chairman and CEO of JPMorgan Chase, has said he uses the OODA loop in scenario evaluation.

== Criticism ==
Some scholars are critical of the concept. Aviation historian Michael Hankins, for example, writes that "the OODA loop is vague enough that its defenders and attackers can each see what they want to see in it. For some, the OODA concept's flexibility is its strength, but for others it becomes so generalized as to lose its usefulness." He concludes that "The OODA loop is merely one way among a myriad of ways of describing intuitive processes of learning and decision making that most people experience daily. It is not incorrect, but neither is it unique or especially profound."

== See also ==
- Cybernetics
- Decision cycle
  - Scan/See Identify Predict Decide Execute (SIPDE)
- Double-loop learning
- Feedback loop
- Improvement cycle
  - DMAIC
  - PDCA
- Learning cycle
- Maneuver warfare
- Mental model
- Nursing process
- Problem solving
- Situation awareness
- SWOT analysis
- United States Army Strategist
