= R v Starr =

- Supreme Court of Canada

Hearing: December 3, 1998 Rehearing: February 24, 2000 Judgment: September 29, 2000
- Full case name: Robert Dennis Starr v Her Majesty The Queen
- Citations: [2000] 2 SCR 144, 2000 SCC 40

Court membership
- Chief Justice: Antonio Lamer CJ (*)/Beverley McLachlin CJ(+)
- Puisne Justices: L'Heureux‑Dubé, Gonthier, Cory(*), McLachlin (*), Iacobucci, Major, Bastarache, Binnie, Arbour(+) and LeBel(+) JJ (*) hearing only, (+) rehearing only

Reasons given
- Majority: Iacobucci J, joined by Major, Binnie, Arbour and Lebel JJ
- Dissent: L'Heureux‑Dubé J, joined by Gonthier J
- Dissent: McLachlin CJ, joined by Bastarache J

Laws applied
- R v Lifchus, [1997] 3 SCR 320

R v Starr [2000] 2 S.C.R. 144, 2000 SCC 40 is a leading Supreme Court of Canada decision that re-evaluated several principles of evidence. In particular, they held the "principled approach" towards hearsay evidence under R v Khan and R v Smith (1992) can be equally used to exclude otherwise admissible hearsay evidence. In addition, the Court examined the judge's charge to the jury on the standard of beyond a reasonable doubt.

== Background ==
In August 1994, Bernard Cook and Darlene Weselowski were drinking with Robert Dennis Starr in a hotel near Winnipeg. In the late hours of the night Starr parted ways with Cook and Weselowski. Together, Cook and Weselowski were approached by Jodie Giesbrecht, a sometimes girlfriend of Cook. During an ensuing conversation Cook told Giesbrecht that he could not go with her that night because he had to "go and do an Autopac scam with Robert", as he had been given $500 for wrecking a car for insurance purposes.

A few hours later the bodies of both Cook and Weselowski were found on the side of a nearby highway. They had been shot in the head. Starr was arrested in connection with the murders.

At trial, the Crown advanced the theory that the murders were gang-related, where Starr had used the insurance fraud scam as a means to get Cook into the countryside to murder him. The case hinged on the testimony of Giesbrecht and the statement she heard from Cook that night. The trial judge found the statement admissible on the "present intentions" or "state of mind" exception to the hearsay rule.

== Reasons of the court ==
In a five-to-four decision, the Supreme Court held the evidence should not be admitted and sent the case back for a retrial.

=== Principled Approach ===
Two significant holdings came from Starr, which affected the way the principled approach was to be implemented. The first was that the traditional hearsay exceptions would continue to operate, but that they would have to conform to the principled approach's tenets of reliability and necessity (at paragraphs 202–207). Therefore, if a conflict arose between the traditional exceptions and the principled approach, it would be the principled approach that would prevail. The second and most controversial aspect of the decision was that in assessing threshold reliability, the trial judge must only consider the circumstances surrounding the making of the statement (at paragraphs 215–217). This holding effectively barred the consideration of corroborative evidence in the reliability assessment. This aspect of Starr was overruled by R v Khelawon, 2006 SCC 57 on December 14, 2006.

=== Jury instruction ===
As a side issue, the Court held that the judge failed to properly instruct the jury on the standard of proof. The judge should have placed "beyond a reasonable doubt" between absolute certainty and "balance of probabilities".

=== Where the law stands ===
Although Starr still has precedential value, the Court explicitly overturned some of its findings in Khelawon. Charron J at paragraph 4 said:

As I will explain, I have concluded that the factors to be considered on the admissibility inquiry cannot be categorized in terms of threshold and ultimate reliability. Comments to the contrary in previous decisions of this Court should no longer be followed. Rather, all relevant factors should be considered including, in appropriate cases, the presence of supporting or contradictory evidence. In each case, the scope of the inquiry must be tailored to the particular dangers presented by the evidence and limited to determining the evidentiary question of admissibility.

Once the proposed evidence is identified as hearsay, it is presumptively inadmissible. I stress the nature of the hearsay rule as a general exclusionary rule because the increased flexibility introduced in the Canadian law of evidence in the past few decades has sometimes tended to blur the distinction between admissibility and weight. Modifications have been made to a number of rules, including the rule against hearsay, to bring them up to date and to ensure that they facilitate rather than impede the goals of truth seeking, judicial efficiency and fairness in the adversarial process. However, the traditional rules of evidence reflect considerable wisdom and judicial experience. The modern approach has built upon their underlying rationale, not discarded it. In Starr itself, where this Court recognized the primacy of the principled approach to hearsay exceptions, the presumptive exclusion of hearsay evidence was reaffirmed in strong terms. Iacobucci J. stated as follows (at para. 199):

By excluding evidence that might produce unfair verdicts, and by ensuring that litigants will generally have the opportunity to confront adverse witnesses, the hearsay rule serves as a cornerstone of a fair justice system.

== See also ==
- List of Supreme Court of Canada cases (McLachlin Court)
