= Graat v R =

Judgement of the Supreme Court of Canada

- Court: Supreme Court of Canada
- Decided: [1982] 2 S.C.R. 819
- Plaintiff: Anthony Graat
- Citation: [1982] 2 S.C.R. 819

Court membership
- Judge sitting: Justice Dickson

Case opinions
- Lay persons may give opinion evidence under certain conditions

Graat v R, [1982] 2 S.C.R. 819, is the leading case decided by the Supreme Court of Canada on the admissibility of opinion evidence. The Court held that lay persons may give opinion evidence, which is normally reserved only for expert witnesses, where the opinion so closely infers fact that it is a "compendious statement of fact". The determination is left to the discretion of the trial judge.

== Background ==
Anthony Graat was pulled over by London, Ontario police. To the officers he appeared intoxicated and so was arrested for impaired driving. At the scene of the arrest Graat complained of chest pains and so was taken to the hospital. Due to the stop at the hospital the two-hour limit in which to get a breathalyzer test expired. At trial the only evidence the Crown could lead with was the testimony of the police officers. The defence tried to have the evidence excluded as opinion evidence.

Graat (1982) Supreme Court found: The witnesses all had an opportunity for personal observations. They were not deciding a matter for the court to decide as the weight of the evidence is entirely a matter for the judge who could accept all or part or none of their evidence.

== Reasons of the court ==
Justice Dickson, writing for a unanimous court, held that the statements were admissible. Despite their experience, the police officers were not considered experts for determining intoxication and so were limited to giving testimony on observed facts. The trial judge however had discretion to admit certain types of opinion evidence where the distinction between opinion and fact are not clear. Dickson rejected the "ultimate issue" doctrine, which prohibits opinion evidence on matters that concern the ultimate legal issue of the trial.

== See also ==
- List of Supreme Court of Canada cases
