= Cross-examination =

Interrogation of a witness called by one's opponent

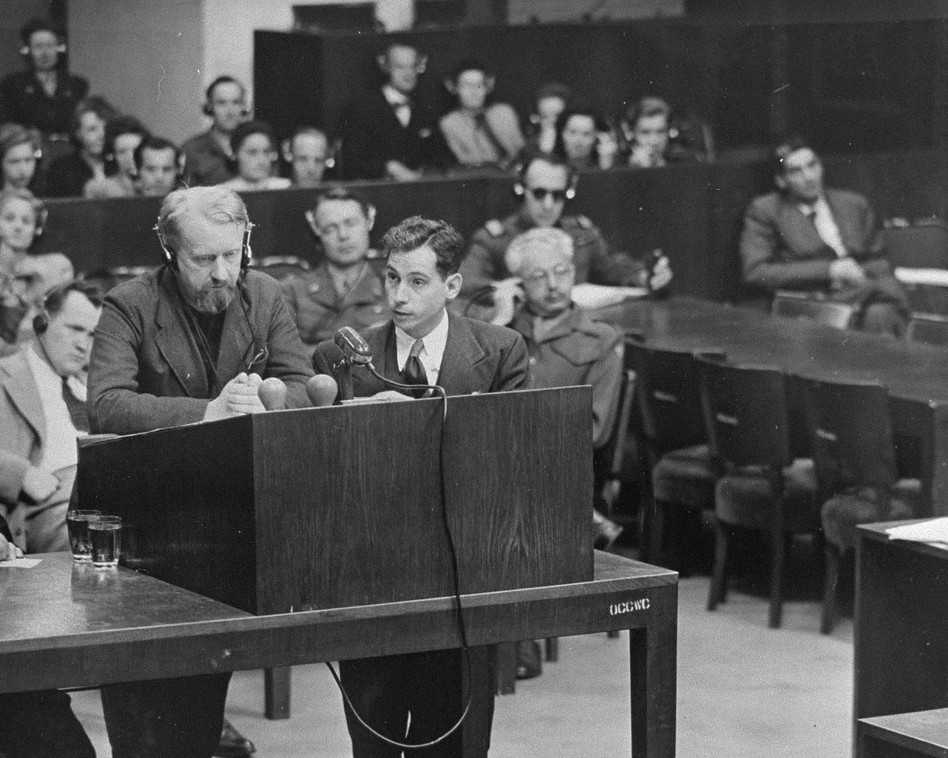
Chief prosecutor James M. McHaney examines defendant Gerhard Rose at the Doctors' Trial.

In law, cross-examination is the interrogation of a witness by one's opponent. It is preceded by direct examination (known as examination-in-chief in Ireland, the United Kingdom, Australia, Canada, South Africa, India and Pakistan) and may be followed by a redirect (known as re-examination in the aforementioned countries). A redirect examination, performed by the attorney or pro se individual who performed the direct examination, clarifies the witness' testimony provided during cross-examination including any subject matter raised during cross-examination but not discussed during direct examination. Recross examination addresses the witness' testimony discussed in redirect by the opponent. Depending on the judge's discretion, opponents are allowed multiple opportunities to redirect and recross examine witnesses (this may vary by jurisdiction).

== Variations by jurisdiction ==
In the United States federal courts, a cross-examining attorney is generally limited by Rule 611 of the Federal Rules of Evidence to the "subject matter of the direct examination and matters affecting the witness's credibility". The rule also permits the trial court, in its discretion, to "allow inquiry into additional matters as if on direct examination". Many state courts do permit a lawyer to cross-examine a witness on matters not raised during direct examination, though California restricts cross-examination to "any matter within the scope of the direct examination". Similarly, courts in England, South Africa, Australia, and Canada allow a cross-examiner to exceed the scope of direct examination.

Since a witness called by the opposing party is presumed to be hostile, leading questions are allowed on cross-examination. A witness called by a direct examiner, on the other hand, may only be treated as hostile by that examiner after being permitted to do so by the judge, at the request of that examiner and as a result of the witness being openly antagonistic and/or prejudiced against the party that called them.

== Affecting the outcome of jury trials ==
Cross-examination is a key component of a trial and the topic is given substantial attention during courses on trial advocacy. The opinions of a jury or judge are often changed if cross-examination casts doubt on the witness. On the other hand, a credible witness may reinforce the substance of their original statements and enhance the judge's or jury's belief. Though the closing argument is often considered the deciding moment of a trial, effective cross-examination wins trials.

Attorneys anticipate hostile witnesses' responses during pretrial planning, and often attempt to shape the witnesses' perception of the questions to draw out information helpful to the attorney's case. Typically during an attorney's closing argument, they will repeat any admissions made by witnesses that favor their case. In the United States, cross-examination is seen as a core part of the entire adversarial system of justice, in that it "is the principal means by which the believability of a witness and the truth of his testimony are tested." Another key component affecting a trial outcome is jury selection, in which attorneys will attempt to include jurors from whom they feel they can get a favorable response or at the least an unbiased fair decision. So while there are many factors affecting the outcome of a trial, the cross-examination of a witness will often influence an open-minded unbiased jury searching for the certainty of facts upon which to base their decision.

== See also ==
- Litigation strategy – high level plan to achieve the overarching goal of a lawsuit
- Testimony – Solemn attestation as to the truth of a matter
- Trial advocacy – Improving effectiveness of advocates
- Witness impeachment – Process of calling into question the credibility of an individual testifying in a trial
