= Leading question =

Question that suggests a particular answer

A leading question is a question that suggests a particular answer and contains information the examiner is looking to have confirmed. The use of leading questions in court to elicit testimony is restricted in order to reduce the ability of the examiner to direct or influence the evidence presented. Depending on the circumstances, leading questions can be objectionable or proper.

The propriety of leading questions generally depends on the relationship of the witness to the party conducting the examination. An examiner may generally ask leading questions of a hostile witness or on cross-examination ("Will help to elicit the testimony of a witness who, due to age, incapacity, or limited intelligence, is having difficulty communicating their evidence"), but not on direct examination (to "coach" the witness to provide a particular answer).

Cairns-Lee, Lawley & Tosey have reviewed the role of leading questions in research interviews and proposed a typology and a 'cleanness rating' to facilitate researchers to review and assess the influence of their interview questions.

== Example ==
Leading questions may often be answerable with a yes or no (though not all yes–no questions are leading). Leading questions are distinct from loaded questions, which are objectionable because they contain implicit assumptions (such as "Have you stopped beating your wife?" indirectly asserting that the subject both has a wife, and has beaten her at some point).

Leading question: "Mr. Smith's car was traveling 20 miles over the speed limit when he lost control of his vehicle and slammed into the victim's car, right?" (Leads the witness to the conclusion that Mr. Smith was speeding, and as a result lost control of his vehicle, leading to the accident, which was clearly his fault.)

Neutral question: "How fast would you estimate Mr. Smith's car was traveling before the collision?"

Even neutral questions can lead witnesses to answers based on word choice, response framing, assumptions made, and form. The words "fast", "collision" and "How", for example, can alter speed estimates provided by respondents.

When someone asks a leading question, they expect the other person to agree with the leading question.

"Our company has the best sandwiches, right?"

They expect the answer to agree that the sandwiches are the best.

== United States ==
While each state has its own rules of evidence, many states model their rules on the Federal Rules of Evidence, which themselves relate closely to the common-law mode of examination. Rule 611(c) of the Federal Rules of Evidence provides that:

Leading questions should not be used on the direct examination of a witness except as may be necessary to develop the witness' testimony. Ordinarily leading questions should be permitted on cross-examination. When a party calls a hostile witness, an adverse party, or a witness identified with an adverse party, interrogation may be by leading questions.

Leading questions are the primary mode of examination of witnesses who are hostile to the examining party, and are not objectionable in that context. Examination of hostile witnesses usually takes place on cross-examination. As the rule recognizes, the examination of a "hostile witness, an adverse party, or a witness identified with an adverse party" will sometimes take place on direct examination, and leading questions are permitted.

In practice, judges will sometimes permit leading questions on direct examination of friendly witnesses with respect to preliminary matters that are necessary to provide background or context, and which are not in dispute; for example, a witness's employment or education. Leading questions may also be permitted on direct examination when a witness requires special handling, for example a child. However, the court must take care to be sure that the examining attorney is not coaching the witness through leading questions. Courts may also cite the various editions of McCormick's and Wigmore's treatises on evidence to answer whether a closed-ended question is inherently leading.

Although Rule 611(c) of the Federal Rules of Evidence (and comparable rules of many states) do not prohibit leading questions on re-direct, some states have expressly limited the use of leading questions on re-direct. As a practical matter, it rests within the trial court's discretion as to what leading questions may be asked on re-direct. Generally speaking, leading questions will be more liberally permitted on re-direct in order to establish a foundation and call the attention of the witness to specific testimony elicited on cross examination. Additionally, on re-direct, an interrogator will often ask questions which specifically seek to elicit whether an inference resulting from questioning on cross examinations is accurate. Although these types of questions will likely result in a "yes" or "no" response, they are properly understood to be direct questions, not leading questions, and are permissible.

Exceptions to general restrictions against leading questions may arise,

- Where the witness is hostile to the examiner, or reluctant or unwilling to testify, in which situation the witness is unlikely to accept being "coached" by the questioner.
- To bring out preliminary matters (name, occupation, and other pedigree information).
- Where the memory of the witness has been exhausted and there is still information to be elicited.

== See also ==
- Fallacy of many questions
- Loaded question
- Push polling
- Suggestive question, similar to leading question but manipulates the respondent to answer in a specific way.
