= Hostile witness =

Antagonistic or contrary witness

A hostile witness, also known as an adverse witness or an unfavorable witness, is a witness at trial whose testimony on direct examination is either openly antagonistic or appears to be contrary to the legal position of the party who called the witness. This concept is used in the legal proceedings in the United States, and analogues of it exist in other legal systems in Western countries.

== Process ==
During direct examination, if the examining attorney who called the witness finds that their testimony is antagonistic or contrary to the legal position of their client, the attorney may request that the judge declare the witness "hostile". If the request is granted, the attorney may proceed to ask the witness leading questions. Leading questions either suggest the answer ("You saw my client sign the contract, correct?") or challenge (impeach) the witness's testimony. As a rule, leading questions are generally allowed only during cross-examination, but a hostile witness is an exception to this rule.

In cross-examination conducted by the opposing party's attorney, a witness is presumed to be hostile and the examining attorney is not required to seek the judge's permission before asking leading questions. Attorneys can influence a hostile witness's responses by using Gestalt psychology to influence the way the witness perceives the situation, and utility theory to understand their likely responses. The attorney will integrate a hostile witness's expected responses into the larger case strategy through pretrial planning and through adapting as necessary during the course of the trial.

== Jurisdiction ==
=== Australia ===
In the state of New South Wales, the term 'unfavourable witness' is defined by section 38 of the Evidence Act which permits the prosecution to cross-examine their own witness. For example, if the prosecution calls all material witnesses relevant to a case before the court, and any evidence given is not favourable to, or supports the prosecution case, or a witness has given a prior inconsistent statement, then the prosecution may seek leave of the court, via section 192, to test the witness in relation to their evidence.

=== New Zealand ===
In New Zealand, section 94 of the Evidence Act 2006 permits a party to cross-examine their own witness if the presiding judge determines the witness to be hostile and gives permission.

=== Philippines ===
In the Philippines, a witness in a case can only be declared as 'hostile or unwilling' by a court which determines the person exhibits adverse interest, unjustified reluctance to testify; or having misled the party into calling the witness to the stand. These are stated in section 12 of the Revised Rules on Evidence.
