= Redirect examination =

US legal term

Redirect examination, in the United States, is the questioning of a witness who has already provided testimony under oath in response to direct examination as well as cross examination by the opponent. On redirect, the attorney offering the witness will ask additional questions that attempt to rehabilitate the witness's credibility, or otherwise mitigate deficiencies identified and explored by the opponent on cross. For example, the opponent might elicit on cross-examination an admission that the witness did not directly perceive every single part of the events at issue; the proponent will attempt on redirect to establish that the witness perceived enough of those events that the finder of fact can draw reasonable inferences as to the gaps where the witness's perception was obstructed.

"Recross" is sometimes allowed, but usually the opposing attorney must ask for permission from the judge before proceeding with that additional round of questioning.

In many common-law jurisdictions, including Australia, Canada, and the United Kingdom, the process is known as re-examination.

== See also ==
- Cross-examination
- Direct examination
