= Litigation strategy =

Process by which litigation is achieved

Litigation strategy is the process by which counsel for one party to a lawsuit intends to integrate their actions with anticipated events and reactions to achieve the overarching goal of the litigation. The strategic goal may be the verdict, or the damages or sentence awarded in the case. Alternatively, in the case of impact litigation (also known as strategic litigation) the goal may be more far-reaching, such as setting legal precedent, affecting consumer-safety standards, or reshaping the public's perception of a societal issue. Broader goals and more challenging cases require a strategist with a greater understanding of, and facility with, the tools of litigation strategy.

Attorneys who apply advanced strategic concepts (such as Maneuver and the Boyd Loop), which are not taught in most law schools, may gain a decisive advantage over attorneys who are unfamiliar with the skill set and who, because of their unfamiliarity, can be unwittingly maneuvered into disadvantageous actions. The resulting imbalance has led to academic criticism of the use of advanced strategic techniques. For instance, Hugh Selby of Australian National University's College of Law has been particularly critical of its use by prosecutors, who already wield the massive power of the state against often poorly resourced defendants. The counterargument is that strategy can correct already-existing imbalances in the system, allowing a sole or two-attorney law firm with an indigent client to level the playing field against a large law firm with a wealthy corporate client, and allowing attorneys with little trial experience to effectively try cases against vastly more experienced opposing counsel.

== Description ==
Strategy is the process of designing and achieving a desired final outcome. Basic litigation strategies organize a case so that it has a cohesive focus. Advanced strategies will anticipate and even shape events, decisively guiding the situation to the desired outcome. Litigation strategies are either primarily direct or primarily indirect, though they usually include elements of both. In litigation, direct strategies argue: 1) what the law does or does not say; 2) what the facts are or are not; or, 3) who has the more believable witnesses. Indirect strategies, on the other hand, shift the point of conflict, alter perceptions of what is central, or undermine the opposing counsels’ case without direct confrontation, often through deception, surprise or misdirection of the opponent—though never of the jury.

Trial advocacy offers a number of tools and methods for constructing sound strategies.

On a practical level, litigation strategy commonly includes an assessment of resources of all parties to the dispute, which can inform attritional considerations and likely attitude to risk, tactical court applications such as injunction applications or other tactical procedures aimed at gaining an advantage over the opponent or even a decisive blow and end to the dispute. Timing is also generally an essential part of any litigation strategy.

== Tools of litigation strategy ==
=== Case diagrams ===
With this organizational tool, attorneys list the elements of the case they are required to prove (or intend to disprove) then list all the evidence they intend to leverage in support of each element. The purpose is to ensure they address all the issues of the case and to make certain that meeting one element does not require undercutting the evidence in support of another.

=== Theme and theory ===
These messaging tools bring force and greater direction to the evidence. The theme is a sound bite that encapsulates logic or emotional force of the attorney's case. The theory of the case is a logical description of events that the attorney wants the judge or jury to adopt as their own perception of the underlying situation. The theory is often expressed in a story that should be compellingly probable.

Theme and theory become strategic tools when they serve as the core for the organization of the case. These tools are effective when every aspect of the trial, including the actions and reactions of the adversary, are organized and incorporated in support of them. In practice, a lawyer writes the closing argument first and then works backward to plan the argument.

=== Maneuver strategy ===
Maneuver is a strategic philosophy that leverages the indirect approach through its focus on individual decision making and perception. It is ideally suited to litigation, wherein the jury's perception decides the outcome. The core of maneuver is the decision cycle as described in Boyd’s OODA Loop.

This model notes that in decision-making, individuals (witness, opposing counsel, jurors) go through a process of observation (receiving information), orientation (deciding what the information means to them and what they might do about it), decision (picking a course of action from among the possibilities), and then acting (taking the course of action). Like most models, the OODA Loop is not a technical description, but it is rather a tool for illustrating important points for strategists.

While litigation presents opportunities for information denial through the rules of privilege and work product, even more opportunities to shape the conduct of opposing counsel and hostile witnesses arise in the orientation phase. Psychology offers deep insights into how individuals perceive and misperceive information. Moreover, an individual’s perception of a situation affects how he frames his decisions. By altering perceptions, litigators can shape the decision the party will make. Coupling this understanding of psychology with utility theory / economic game theory, attorneys can set the stage for adversarial parties to take actions that serve the attorneys’ plan. At the same time, the attorneys must protect their own decision-making while retaining a degree of control over the evolving situation. The methods for protecting one's own decision-making include making accurate predictions (using tools from psychology and utility theory), validating planned actions, having a clear focus of effort and information flow, and building sound, powerful, and flexible plans, as can be done using a “line of effort.”

=== Lines of effort ===
A line of effort can organize the attorneys' planned actions in the way a case diagram organizes their evidence. Because of the uncertainty inherent in trial practice, the litigators’ strategic plan must be powerful, yet flexible, to remain effective. The line of effort produces the needed power and flexibility by structuring the plan around the purpose and an achievable end state that realizes the purpose, the aims (the elements necessary, or chosen to achieve the end state), and the levers or effects (the actions the counsel can take that are likely to bring about the targeted aims).

The visual nature a line of effort allows the attorneys using it to see the entirety of the trial, ensuring their plan comprehensively addresses the situation, and identifying points of high uncertainty where having prepared branch plans would be prudent. It further allows the attorney to exploit unexpected opportunities with an understanding of what elements of his/her plan will be enhanced and which will require further adaptation, making the opportunistic action not only clear-sighted, but focused and efficient.

In a fluid situation, any levers or aims rendered obsolete by changes in the situation are swapped out, retaining the bulk of the previously analyzed and validated plan intact, and providing a clear focus for the branch plan or substituted actions.

== Bibliography ==
- Dreier, A.S. Strategy, Planning & Litigating to Win. Boston MA: Conatus, 2012. ISBN 9780615676951
- Lubet, Steven Modern Trial Advocacy. South Bend, IN. NITA, 2004. ISBN 1556818866
- Mauet, Thomas A., Trial Notebook. New York, NY: Aspen, 1998. ISBN 156706941X
