= Witness impeachment =

Process of calling into question the credibility of an individual testifying in a trial

Witness impeachment, in the law of evidence of the United States, is the process of calling into question the credibility of an individual testifying in a trial. The Federal Rules of Evidence contain the rules governing impeachment in US federal courts.

== Parties that may impeach ==
Under the common law of England, a party could not impeach its own witness unless one of four special circumstances was met. The Voucher Rule required the proponent of the witness to "vouch" for the truthfulness of the witness. Here are the special circumstances:

1. If the witness were an adverse party (such as the plaintiff calling the defendant to the stand, or vice versa).
2. If the witness were hostile (such as the witness refusing to co-operate).
3. If the witness were one that the party was required by law to call as a witness.
4. If the witness surprised the party who called him by giving damaging testimony against that party.

The rule has been eliminated in many jurisdictions. Under the US Federal Rules of Evidence, Rule 607 permits any party to attack the credibility of any witness.

== Methods ==
In the US, a party has the option of discrediting a witness through impeachment by cross-examining the witness about facts that reflect poorly on the witness's credibility or, in some cases, by introducing extrinsic evidence that reflects negatively on the witness's truthfulness or knowledge.

In Pennsylvania, the procedure for determining whether a testifying defendant may be impeached is known as a Bighum hearing.

== Categories ==
A party may impeach a witness in the US by introducing evidence of any of the following (remembered via the mnemonic BICCC):

=== Bias ===
Courts permit parties to cross-examine a witness in order to impeach that witness based on demonstration of bias. Witness bias may be catalyzed by any number of circumstances, ranging from the witness's blood relationship to a party to his financial stake in the outcome of the litigation. Most US jurisdictions require a cross-examiner to lay a foundation before extrinsic evidence can be used to demonstrate bias for impeachment purposes. Although Rule 610 provides that evidence of a witness's "religious beliefs or opinions is not admissible to attack or support the witness's credibility," an inquiry into the witness's religious beliefs or opinions for the purpose of showing interest or bias because of them is not within the rule's prohibition.

If a witness is accused of bias, and there is an opportunity to cross-examine during the current trial, any statements made at a previous trial/hearing and which are consistent with the testimony at the present trial are admissible, not hearsay.

=== Inconsistent statement ===
A party may impeach a witness by introducing those of his prior statements that are inconsistent with his current testimony at trial. In a minority of jurisdictions that follow FRE 801, the prior inconsistent statement may be used not only to impeach but also as substantive evidence.

A prior inconsistent statement is admissible as substantive evidence if

1. the statement was given under penalty of perjury at a trial, hearing, or other proceeding or in a deposition;
2. the witness testifies at the present trial; and
3. the witness is subject to cross-examination about the prior statement. (801(d)(1), 2014, Federal Rules of Evidence by Muller and Kirkpatrick)

A prior inconsistent statement offered solely for impeachment purposes is admissible regardless of whether it satisfies those requirements.

The cross-examining attorney need not disclose or show the contents of a prior inconsistent statement to a witness prior to the moment he is questioned. If the witness's attorney asks to see the prior inconsistent statement, however, the questioning attorney must show or disclose its contents.

=== Character ===
The majority of US jurisdictions permit parties to impeach witnesses by demonstrating their "bad" character regarding truthfulness. Under the Federal Rules a party may demonstrate that by reputation or opinion testimony. That is, a witness's credibility cannot be bolstered, only impeached.

==== Prior conviction ====
Additionally, a party may impeach a witness for "bad" character by introducing evidence of the witness's prior conviction of a crime, subject to a series of rules laid out in 609(a). If the witness's prior conviction was for a crime involving dishonesty or false statement, evidence of that crime is admissible for impeachment purposes regardless of whether the crime was a misdemeanor or a felony. If the witness's prior conviction was for a crime not involving dishonesty or false statement, evidence of the conviction is admissible for impeachment only for felonies; misdemeanors are inadmissible.

Furthermore, if the cross-examining party seeks to introduce evidence of a felony not involving dishonesty or false statement, its success in impeaching the witness will depend on whether the witness is the defendant or not. If the witness is defendant, the burden is on the prosecution to show that the probative value of the impeachment (demonstrating the defendant witness's propensity to lie) outweighs the danger of unfair prejudice to the defendant.

The probative value must merely outweigh unfair prejudice. If the witness is a person other than the defendant, the evidence of the prior felony conviction for a crime not involving dishonesty or false statement is admissible unless the party objecting to the evidence succeeds in the more difficult task of proving that the probative value of the felony conviction is substantially outweighed by the danger of unfair prejudice to the defendant.

The probative value must substantially outweigh unfair prejudice. Finally, if a conviction is more than 10 years old, the probative value of admitting the conviction must substantially outweigh the danger of unfair prejudice under FRE 609(b).

==== No extrinsic evidence ====
A party may impeach a witness for character by cross-examining the witness but not by introducing extrinsic evidence, about specific instances of prior misconduct, often called "prior bad acts," as long as the questions relate to the witness's own character for truthfulness (or untruthfulness) or to the character for untruthfulness of a previous witness that the current witness has testified about before.

Under California Evidence Code Section 787, a party may not use either cross-examination or extrinsic evidence to impeach a witness by showing specific instances of prior misconduct in civil cases.

Proposition 8, the Victims Bill of Rights passed by in 1982, permits parties to use both cross-examination and extrinsic evidence about specific instances of prior misconduct in criminal cases to impeach a witness.

=== Competency ===
The witness was unable to sense what he claimed to have (such as he could not see from where he was), or he lacked the requisite mental capacity. Older common law would exclude an incompetent witness from testifying. Modern rules, such as the Federal Rules of Evidence, allow the witness on the stand (in most cases) to consider competence as one of many factors that juries are to consider to determine credibility of the witness.

=== Contradiction ===
The witness is induced to contradict their own testimony during the present proceeding. That differs from inconsistent statements above. Inconsistent statements involve statements made out-of-court (hearsay) or in prior proceedings. Contradiction involves the witness saying two different things in the same testimony.

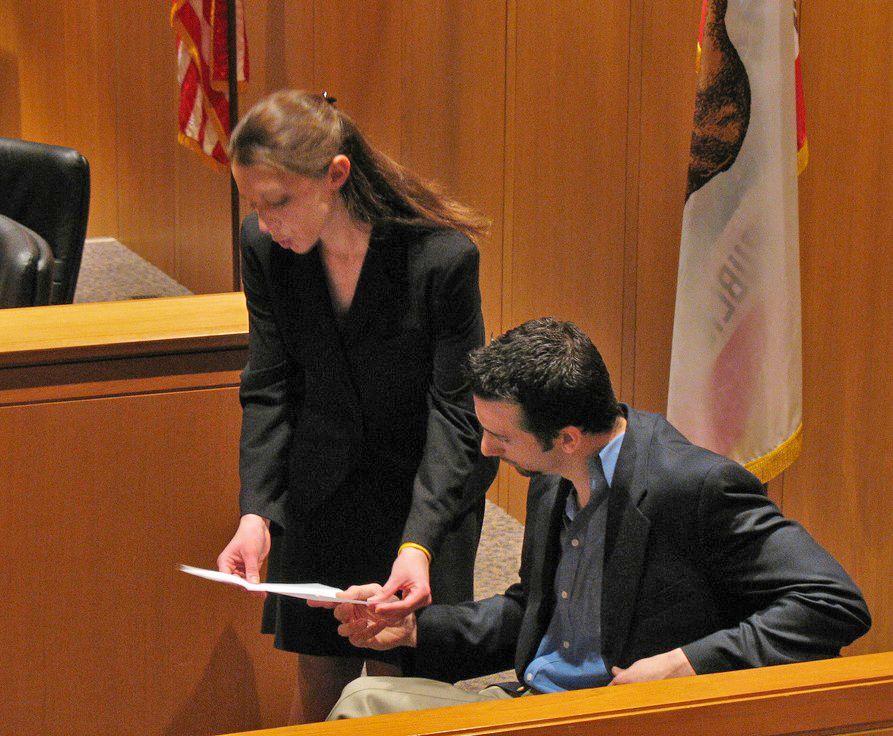
An attorney impeaching a witness during a mock trial competition

Another form of impeachment by contradiction has a subtle effect on the order in which the attorneys present their evidence. When a defense attorney calls a witness who testifies about what happened, or plaintiff's attorney or a prosecutor calls a witness in rebuttal, that gives the opposing attorney the opportunity to present evidence contradicting that witness. Had impeachment by contradiction not been allowed by the rules of evidence, the second attorney would have been barred from presenting the contradicting evidence because the second attorney already had only one chance to prove the facts of the case as claimed. Since his opponent put on a witness, that "opens the door" to strengthen the case by going again with more proof of what happened: the only legal excuse for the rehash of the claim is impeaching by contradiction his opponent's witness.

Another use of impeachment by contradiction can be explained negatively. An attorney cannot contradict an opponent's witness on a trivial ("collateral") fact like the color of the hat worn on the day she witnessed the accident, but on more important matters normally excluded by the rules of relevance, contradiction may be allowed. Thus, a witness might not normally be permitted to testify being a safe driver and the opponent cannot normally prove that the driver is unsafe, but if the witness nonetheless happens to testify being a safe driver (no objection was made to the question), the opponent can now contradict by eliciting on cross-examination that the driver was involved in several accidents. Had contradiction impeachment not been permitted, the unsafe character of the witness would have been barred by the rules of evidence.

Another example is more extreme. Suppose the defendant is on trial for possession of heroin. The defendant's testimony will naturally deny possessing the particular drug. Suppose the defendant foolishly testifies on direct examination, "In fact, I've never possessed heroin in my life." The prosecutor can then, on cross-examination, impeach him with an exhibit of heroin seized on an unrelated occasion even if it was seized in violation of his Fourth Amendment rights. The Walder decision led to a ruling that a defendant can be impeached by his confession even if the confession was obtained in violation of his Miranda rights. Harris, in turn, led to a decision allowing similar impeachment by physical evidence that had been suppressed in the same case as having been seized from defendant in violation of his Fourth Amendment rights.

Impeachment by contradiction evidence is admitted solely to impeach: it cannot be used to prove anything about the events being litigated but only to discredit the witness's credibility. The theory is that when a witness can be contradicted, it should be taken into account in determining the reliability of the witness so the jury is instructed by the judge not to use the impeachment evidence as proof of any facts but only to consider whether the witness in question should be believed.

All experienced courtroom observers, however, agree that jurors will have great difficulty understanding that distinction, known as "limited admissibility" or "admissibility for a limited purpose". Even more unlikely is the prospect that a juror who understands the instruction will be psychologically capable of obeying it. The only practical impact of this limited admissibility is that the evidence cannot be used to prop up a weak case that would otherwise be dismissed by the court for insufficient evidence, as it was admitted only for the impeachment of a witness.

== Bolstering and rehabilitating ==
The general rule is that the proponent of a witness may not attempt to build up the witness's credibility prior to being impeached. The rationale is that the witness is presumed trustworthy. It also speeds proceedings by not spending time bolstering when the other side may not even impeach the witness.

To rehabilitate a witness, the proponent is confined to using the same techniques used by the opponent to impeach the witness. That is, if the opponent impeached via bias, rehabilitation is limited to negating the claim of bias. If the opponent brought in a rebuttal witness who testified to the character of principal witness as that of a liar, rehabilitation is limited to a character witness who testifies principal witness is a truthful person. That is a different consideration from the ever-present right to cross-examine any witness, including character witnesses.

If the opponent shows that the witness made a prior inconsistent statement and implies that after that statement and prior to trial the witness was "gotten to" or otherwise developed a motive to lie in court, rehabilitation can be attempted by showing that the witness made a prior consistent statement (consistent with the testimony) before the alleged events that gave rise to the alleged motive to lie. The jury is left with two pretrial statements that are inconsistent with each other, but only one is inconsistent with the testimony, and both were made before the witness was allegedly gotten to. Thus, there might be softening of the accusation that the testimony flows from such as a bribe. Also, there is always a case for allowing a prior consistent statement made at any time before trial to help explain away what is arguably only a seemingly inconsistent statement that is subject to interpretation, such as if it was lifted out of the context that would explain the statement.

== See also ==
- Turn state's evidence – Legal term for one who testifies as a witness for the state
