= Opinion evidence =

Type of direct evidence

Opinion evidence refers to direct evidence outlining what the expert witness, believes, or infers in regard to facts, as distinguished from personal knowledge of the facts themselves. In common law jurisdictions the general rule is that a witness is supposed to testify as to what was observed and not to give an opinion on what was observed. However, there are two exceptions to this rule: expert evidence and non-expert opinion given by laymen which people in their daily lives reach without conscious ratiocination.

== General rule ==
In general, witnesses should testify only as to the facts observed and should not give opinion.

The main rationale for such a rule is that the admission of opinion evidence would not assist, or might even mislead, the court and in particular the jury. This is because opinion evidence is usually irrelevant. Moreover, admission of such evidence would usurp the functions of the jury, which alone should be the tribunal of fact and draw its own inferences.

For instance, the court may in order to prove handwriting in any document take help of an expert who will compare the handwriting in document with the handwriting of persons by whom such document in purported to be written.

Another example can be a DNA test.The court may rely on a DNA expert in order to ascertain the parentage of a child or a person.

== Expert evidence ==
An expert witness is a witness, who by virtue of education, training, skill, or experience, is believed to have expertise and specialised knowledge in a particular subject beyond that of the average person, sufficient that others may officially and legally rely upon the witness's specialized (scientific, technical or other) opinion about an evidence or fact issue within the scope of his expertise, referred to as the expert opinion, as an assistance to the fact-finder. Expert witnesses may also deliver expert evidence about facts from the domain of their expertise. The facts upon which an expert opinion is based must be proved by admissible evidence. The duty of experts is to furnish the judge with the necessary scientific criteria for testing the accuracy of their conclusions, so that the judge or jury can form their own independent judgment by the application of these criteria to the facts proved.

== Non-expert opinion ==
Non-expert opinion refers to the opinion given in restricted circumstances by laymen or persons who do not possess any expertise. These circumstances mainly concern matters of everyday life where a person may be expected to give opinions and which opinions may be safely acted upon by others.

Such circumstances cannot be definitively laid out in a closed list of cases. However, cases in which non-expert opinion has been admitted include:

- Apparent age of a person
- Apparent age of objects
- Speed
- Weather
- Drunkenness
- Identification of handwriting
- Eyewitness identification
- Identification of physical objects
- The general body condition or emotional state of a person
- The general condition of objects
- The approximate value of objects
- Approximate distance
- Time
- Ability to speak and understand a language
