= Prior consistent statements and prior inconsistent statements =

Prior consistent statements and prior inconsistent statements, in the law of evidence, occur where a witness, testifying at trial, makes a statement that is either consistent or inconsistent, respectively, with a previous statement given at an earlier time such as during a discovery, interview, or interrogation. The examiner can impeach the witness when an inconsistent statement is found, and may conversely bolster the credibility of an impeached witness with a prior consistent statement.

== Impeachment with a prior inconsistent statement ==
Before the witness can be impeached the examiner must have extrinsic evidence of the prior statement. The examiner must also provide the witness with the opportunity to adopt or reject the previous statement.

In the majority of U.S. jurisdictions, prior inconsistent statements may not be introduced to prove the truth of the prior statement itself, as this constitutes hearsay, but only to impeach the credibility of the witness.

However, under Federal Rule of Evidence 801 and the minority of U.S. jurisdictions that have adopted this rule, a prior inconsistent statement may be introduced as evidence of the truth of the statement itself if the prior statement was given in live testimony and under oath as part of a formal hearing, proceeding, trial, or deposition.

- Note that under California Evidence Code ("CEC") §§769, 770, and 1235, prior inconsistent statements may be used for both impeachment and as substantive evidence, even if they were not originally made under oath at a formal proceeding, as long as "the witness was so examined while testifying as to give him an opportunity to explain or to deny the statement."

== Bolstering with a prior consistent statement ==
A prior consistent statement is not a hearsay exception; the FRE specifically define it as non-hearsay. A prior consistent statement is admissible:

1. to rebut an express or implied charge that the declarant recently fabricated a statement, for instance, during her testimony at trial;
2. the witness testifies at the present trial; and
3. the witness is subject to cross-examination about the prior statement.

There is no requirement that the prior consistent statement have been made under oath at a prior trial or hearing.

A form of prior consistent statement excepted from this rule is that of prior identification by the witness of another person in a lineup.
