= Character evidence =

Legal term

Character evidence is a term used in the law of evidence to describe any testimony or document submitted for the purpose of proving that a person acted in a particular way on a particular occasion based on the character or disposition of that person. In the United States, Federal Rule of Evidence 404 sets out its permissible and prohibited uses in trials. Three factors typically determine the admissibility of character evidence:

1. the purpose for which the character evidence is being used
2. the form in which the character evidence is offered
3. the type of proceeding (civil or criminal) in which the character evidence is offered

== Purpose ==
In the United States, character evidence may be offered at trial to:

1. prove character, if character is a substantive issue in the litigation

admissibility of character evidence to prove character is not affected by the case's civil or criminal nature

2. prove, through circumstantial evidence, an aspect of an individual's conduct

character evidence's admissibility as circumstantial evidence is influenced by the case's civil or criminal nature

3. impeach or strengthen the credibility of a witness

Character may be a substantive issue in defamation suits, in lawsuits alleging negligent hiring or negligent entrustment, in child custody cases, as well as in loss of consortium cases; character evidence is thus admissible to prove the substantive issues that arise in these types of lawsuits.

If used as circumstantial evidence, FRE 404(a)(1) renders inadmissible character evidence offered to prove that an individual acted "in accordance with" a character or trait "on a particular occasion." It lists several exceptions which apply depending on whether the proceeding is civil or criminal, whether the defense or prosecution is offering the character evidence, and what purpose it is being offered for.

== Form ==
Character evidence may be offered, depending on the type of proceeding, party offering the evidence, and purported purpose, explained below, in three forms:

1. as opinion evidence
2. as reputation evidence, and
3. as evidence of specific instances of conduct

== Type of proceeding ==
=== Civil trial ===
In the majority of U.S. jurisdictions, character evidence is inadmissible in civil suits when being used as circumstantial evidence to prove that a person acted in conformity with their character; it is considered to be an unfair basis from which to attempt to prove that an individual behaved in a particular way on a particular occasion. In most jurisdictions, character evidence is admissible in a civil trial only if character is a substantive issue in the case; for example, in cases involving negligent hiring, negligent entrustment, child custody cases, or loss of consortium; or if the evidence is offered to impeach a witness.

A minority of U.S. jurisdictions, however, permit defendants in assault and battery and fraudulent misconduct civil cases to introduce character evidence as circumstantial evidence to prove that a person acted in conformity with their character.

=== Criminal trial ===
==== Character evidence offered by the prosecution ====
In the United States, character evidence is inadmissible in a criminal trial if first offered by the prosecution as circumstantial evidence to show that a defendant is likely to have committed the crime with which they are charged—the prosecution may not, in other words, initiate character evidence that shows the defendant's propensity to commit a crime. However, the prosecution may introduce character evidence for certain limited purposes after the defendant does so—after the defendant has "opened the door"—through the permissible methods and purposes explained below in "Character evidence offered by the defendant," to rebut what the defendant tried showing through character evidence, and to "offer evidence of the defendant's same trait."

FRE 404, in addition to dictating character evidence's permissible use in federal courts, also bars the prosecution's admission of "crimes, wrongs, or other acts" to prove the character of a person in order to show action in conformity therewith (propensity). Evidence of other crimes, wrongs or acts is available for "non-character purposes," such as motive, opportunity, intent, preparation, plan, knowledge, identity, or absence of mistake or accident. In a criminal prosecution, the defendant can request to receive notice of this type of evidence if the prosecution intends to admit it at trial.

- Note that under California Evidence Code §1101(b), in addition to proving MIMIC elements, the prosecution may admit evidence of a victim's prior sexual conduct in a case brought for an unlawful sexual act or attempted unlawful sexual act, to show that the defendant "did not reasonably and in good faith believe that the victim consented."

==== Character evidence offered by the defendant ====
Character evidence is admissible in a criminal trial if offered by a defendant as circumstantial evidence—through reputation or opinion evidence—to show their own character, as long as the character evidence the defendant seeks to introduce is relevant to the crime with which the defendant is charged. For example, if a defendant is charged with a crime involving dishonesty, the defendant may introduce evidence tending to show the defendant's honest character. If the defendant is charged with a violent crime, the defendant may introduce evidence tending to show the defendant's peaceful character.

- Note that under Cal. Evid. Code §1102, a defendant may not only introduce evidence of "a trait of his character" that is relevant to the crime with which they are charged, but may also introduce character evidence "of the defendant's character" generally.

Character evidence is also admissible in a criminal trial if offered by a defendant as circumstantial evidence—through reputation or opinion evidence—to show an alleged victim's "pertinent" character trait—for example, to support the defendant's claim of self-defense to a charge of homicide.

After a criminal defendant introduces evidence of the victim's character, the prosecution may then introduce its own character evidence to rebut the defendant's character evidence by showing its side's impression of the victim's character, or to attack the character of the defendant through evidence that shows that defendant had the same character trait they accused the victim of having.

- Note that under Cal. Evid. Code §1103(a), a defendant may not only introduce evidence of a victim's character or character trait through reputation or opinion evidence, as permitted under FRE 404, but also through evidence of specific acts.

The admissibility of character evidence to allow the defendant to prove the character trait of a victim is limited, however, if the lawsuit is for rape or assault with the intent to commit rape. If the reputation or opinion evidence is being offered by the defendant to show the rape victim's past sexual conduct, character evidence is inadmissible. In such sexual misconduct cases, a defendant may offer "evidence of specific instances of a victim’s sexual behavior" only to show that someone other than the defendant was the source of "semen, injury, or other physical evidence," or to show that the victim had consented to sexual behavior with the defendant.

- Note that under Cal. Evid. Code §1103(c)(1), reputation, opinion, and specific acts evidence are all barred if the defendant seeks to introduce the evidence to show the sexual character of the victim, but evidence of the victim's sexual conduct with the defendant—i.e. specific acts—may be used by the defendant to show that the victim consented to the sexual act.

== Character witness ==
Commentators have noted that the ability of defendants to call character witnesses can give an advantage to more affluent defendants. Affluent defendants can call as character witnesses celebrities, athletes, and prominent members of the community. In contrast, it would be neither advisable nor beneficial to a defendant to call to the stand a disreputable fellow inmate as a character witness.

== Distinguished from habit evidence ==
Character evidence must be distinguished from habit evidence, which is generally admissible, and which is evidence submitted for the purpose of proving that an individual acted in a particular way on a particular occasion in question based on that person's tendency to reflexively respond to a particular situation in a particular way.

== See also ==
- Character test under Australian Migration Act 1958
- Bad character evidence explains the approach taken in English criminal law
