= Jury trial =

Type of legal trial

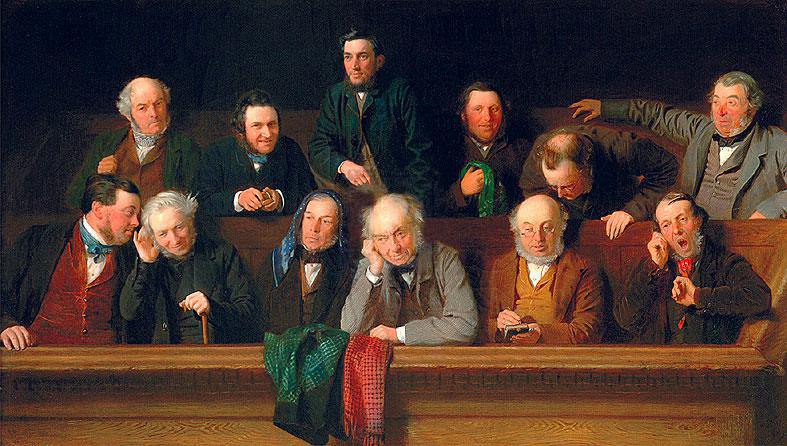
The Jury (1861) by John Morgan, Buckinghamshire County Museum

A jury trial, or trial by jury, is a legal proceeding in which a jury makes findings of fact and reaches a verdict. It is distinguished from a bench trial, in which a judge or panel of judges makes all decisions.

Jury trials are used in a significant share of serious criminal cases in many common law judicial systems, but not all. Juries or lay judges have also been incorporated into the legal systems of many civil law countries for criminal cases.

The use of jury trials, which evolved within common law systems rather than civil law systems, has had a profound impact on the nature of American civil procedure and criminal procedure rules, even if a bench trial is actually contemplated in a particular case. In general, the availability of a jury trial if properly demanded has given rise to a system in which fact finding is concentrated in a single trial rather than multiple hearings, and appellate review of trial court decisions is greatly limited. Jury trials are of far less importance (or of no importance) in countries that do not have a common law system.

== History ==
=== Greece ===
Ancient Athens had a mechanism, called dikastaí, to assure that no one could select jurors for their own trial. For normal cases, the courts were made up of dikastai of up to 500 citizens. For capital cases—those that involved death, loss of liberty, exile, loss of civil rights, or seizure of property—the trial was before a jury of 1,001 to 1,501 dikastai. In such large juries, they rule by majority. Juries were appointed by lot. Jurists cast a ceramic disk with an axle in its middle: the axle was either hollow or solid. Thus the way they voted was kept secret because the jurists would hold their disk by the axle by thumb and forefinger, thus hiding whether its axle was hollow or solid. Since Periclean times, jurists were compensated for their sitting in court, with the amount of one day's wages.

The institution of trial by jury was ritually depicted by Aeschylus in The Eumenides, the third and final play of his Oresteia trilogy. In the play, the innovation is brought about by the goddess Athena, who summons twelve citizens to sit as jury. The god Apollo takes part in the trial as the advocate for the defendant Orestes and the Furies as prosecutors for the slain Clytemnestra. In the event the jury is split six to six, Athena dictates that the verdict should henceforth be for acquittal.

=== Roman Republic and Empire ===
From the beginning of the republic and in the majority of civil cases towards the end of the empire, there were tribunals with the characteristics of the jury in the sense that Roman judges were civilian, lay and not professionals. Capital trials were held in front of hundreds or thousands of 'juries' in the commitias or centuries, the same as in Athenian trials. Roman law provided for the yearly selection of judices, who would be responsible for resolving disputes by acting as jurors, with a praetor performing many of the duties of a judge. High government officials and their relatives were barred from acting as judices, due to conflicts of interest. Those previously found guilty of serious crimes (felonies) were also barred as were gladiators for hire, who likely were hired to resolve disputes through trial by combat. The law was as follows:

The peregrine praetor (literally, traveling judge) within the next ten days after this law is passed by the people or plebs shall provide for the selection of 450 persons in this State who have or have had a knight's census ... provided that he does not select a person who is or has been plebeian tribune, quaestor, triumvir capitalis, military tribune in any of the first four legions, or triumvir for granting and assigning lands, or who is or has been in the Senate, or who has fought or shall fight as a gladiator for hire ... or who has been condemned by the judicial process and a public trial whereby he cannot be enrolled in the Senate, or who is less than thirty or more than sixty years of age, or who does not have his residence in the city of Rome or within one mile of it, or who is the father, brother, or son of any above-described magistrate, or who is the father, brother, or son of a person who is or has been a member of the Senate, or who is overseas.

=== Islamic law ===
In classical Islamic jurisprudence, litigants in court may obtain notarized statements from between three and twelve witnesses. When the statements of all witnesses are consistent, the notaries will certify their unanimous testimony in a legal document, which may be used to support the litigant's claim. The notaries serve to free the judge from the time-consuming task of hearing the testimony of each eyewitness himself, and their documents serve to legally authenticate each oral testimony. The Maliki school of Islamic jurisprudence requires two notaries to collect a minimum of twelve eyewitness statements in certain legal cases, including those involving unregistered marriages and land disputes. John Makdisi has compared this to English Common Law jury trials under King Henry II, surmising a link between the king's reforms and the legal system of the Kingdom of Sicily.

=== Holy Roman Empire and modern Germany ===
A Swabian ordinance of 1562 called for the summons of jurymen (urtheiler), and various methods were in use in Emmendingen, Oppenau, and Oberkirch. Hauenstein's charter of 1442 secured the right to be tried in all cases by 24 fellow equals, and in Freiburg the jury was composed of 30 citizens and councilors. The modern jury trial was first introduced in the Rhenish provinces in 1798, with a court consisting most commonly of 12 citizens (Bürger).

The system whereby citizens were tried by their peers chosen from the entire community in open court was gradually superseded by a system of professional judges in Germany, in which the process of investigation was more or less confidential and judgements were issued by judges appointed by the state. In Constance the jury trial was suppressed by decree of the Habsburg monarchy in 1786. The Frankfurt Constitution of the failed Revolutions of 1848 called for jury trials for "the more serious crimes and all political offenses", but was never implemented after the Frankfurt Parliament was dissolved by Württemberg dragoons. An 1873 draft on criminal procedure produced by the Prussian Ministry of Justice proposed to abolish the jury and replace it with the mixed system, causing a significant political debate. In the Weimar Republic the jury was abolished by the Emminger Reform of 4 January 1924.

Between 1948 and 1950 in American-occupied Germany and the Federal Republic of Germany, Bavaria returned to the jury trial as it had existed before the 1933 emergency decrees, but they were again abolished by the 1950 Unification Act (Vereinheitlichungsgesetz) for the Federal Republic. In 1979, the United States tried the East German LOT Flight 165 hijacking suspects in the United States Court for Berlin in West Berlin, which declared the defendants had the right to a jury trial under the United States Constitution, and hence were tried by a West German jury.

=== England and Wales ===
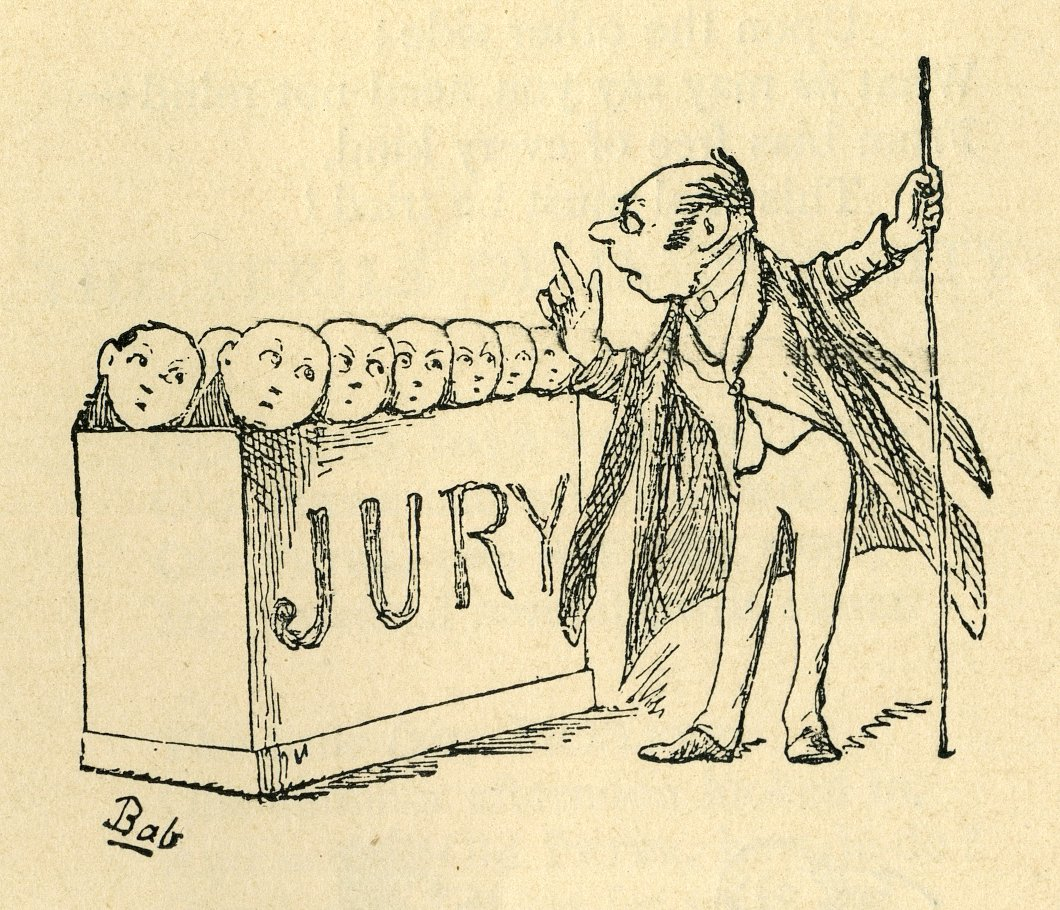
Drawing from a 1920 edition of W. S. Gilbert's Bab Ballads

According to George Macaulay Trevelyan in A Shortened History of England, during the Viking occupation:

The Scandinavians, when not on the Viking warpath, were a litigious people and loved to get together in the thing [governing assembly] to hear legal argument. They had no professional lawyers, but many of their farmer-warriors, like Njáll Þorgeirsson, the truth-teller, were learned in folk custom and in its intricate judicial procedure. A Danish town in England often had, as its main officers, twelve hereditary 'law men.' The Danes introduced the habit of making committees among the free men in court, which perhaps made England favorable ground for the future growth of the jury system out of a Frankish custom later introduced by the Normans.

The English king Æthelred the Unready set up an early legal system through the Wantage Code of Ethelred, one provision of which stated that the twelve leading thegns (minor nobles) of each wapentake (a small district) were required to swear that they would investigate crimes without a bias. These juries differed from the modern sort by being self-informing; instead of getting information through a trial, the jurors were required to investigate the case themselves.

In the 12th century, Henry II took a major step in developing the jury system. Henry II set up a system to resolve land disputes using juries. A jury of twelve free men were assigned to arbitrate in these disputes. As with the Saxon system, these men were charged with uncovering the facts of the case on their own rather than listening to arguments in court. Henry II also introduced what is now known as the "grand jury" through his Assize of Clarendon. Under the assize, a jury of free men was charged with reporting any crimes that they knew of in their hundred to a "justice in eyre", a judge who moved between hundreds on a circuit. A criminal accused by this jury was given a trial by ordeal.

The Church banned participation of clergy in trial by ordeal in 1215. Without the legitimacy of religion, trial by ordeal collapsed. The juries under the assizes began deciding guilt as well as providing accusations. The same year, trial by jury became an explicit right in one of the most influential clauses of Magna Carta. Article 39 of Magna Carta read:

Nullus liber homo capiatur, vel imprisonetur, aut desseisetur de libero tenemento, vel libertatibus, vel liberis consuetudinibus suis, aut utlagetur, aut exuletur, aut aliquo modo destruatur, nec super eum ibimus, nec super eum mittemus, nisi per legale judicium parium suorum, vel per legem terrae.

It is translated thus by Lysander Spooner in his Essay on the Trial by Jury:

No free man shall be captured, and or imprisoned, or disseised of his freehold, and or of his liberties, or of his free customs, or be outlawed, or exiled, or in any way destroyed, nor will we proceed against him by force or proceed against him by arms, but by the lawful judgment of his peers, and or by the law of the land.

Although it says "and or by the law of the land", this in no manner can be interpreted as if it were enough to have a positive law, made by the king, to be able to proceed legally against a citizen. The law of the land was the consuetudinary law, based on the customs and consent of John's subjects, and since they did not have Parliament in those times, this meant that neither the king nor the barons could make a law without the consent of the people.

According to some sources, in the time of Edward III, "by the law of the land" had been substituted "by due process of law", which in those times was a trial by twelve peers.

In 1215, Magna Carta further secured defendants the right to a judgement of "reputable men of the neighbourhood"/"their equals" by stating that

For a trivial offence, a free man shall be fined only in proportion to the degree of his offence, and for a serious offence correspondingly, but not so heavily as to deprive him of his livelihood. In the same way, a merchant shall be spared his merchandise, and a husbandman the implements of his husbandry, if they fall upon the mercy of a royal court. None of these fines shall be imposed except by the assessment on oath of reputable men of the neighbourhood.

Earls and barons shall be fined only by their equals, and in proportion to the gravity of their offence.

To any man whom we have deprived or dispossessed of lands, castles, liberties, or rights, without the lawful judgement of his equals, we will at once restore these.

If we have deprived or dispossessed any Welshmen of lands, liberties, or anything else in England or in Wales, without the lawful judgement of their equals, these are at once to be returned to them. A dispute on this point shall be determined in the Marches by the judgement of equals. English law shall apply to holdings of land in England, Welsh law to those in Wales, and the law of the Marches to those in the Marches. The Welsh shall treat us and ours in the same way.

During the mid-14th century, persons who had sat on the presenting jury (i.e., in modern parlance, the grand jury) were forbidden to sit on the trial jury for that crime. (25 Edw. 3. Stat 5. c. 3) (1353). Medieval juries were self-informing, in that individuals were chosen as jurors because they either knew the parties and the facts, or they had the duty to discover them. This spared the government the cost of fact-finding. Over time, English juries became less self-informing and relied more on the trial itself for information on the case. Jurors remained free to investigate cases on their own until the 17th century. Magna Carta being forgotten after a succession of benevolent reigns (or, more probably, reigns limited by the jury and the barons, and only under the rule of laws that the juries and barons found acceptable), the kings, through the royal judges, began to extend their control over the jury and the kingdom. In David Hume's History of England, he tells something of the powers that the kings had accumulated in the times after Magna Carta, the prerogatives of the crown and the sources of great power with which these monarchs counted:

One of the most ancient and most established instruments of power was the court of Star Chamber, which possessed an unlimited discretionary authority of fining, imprisoning, and inflicting corporal punishment, and whose jurisdiction extended to all sorts of offenses, contempts, and disorders, that lay not within reach of the common law. The members of this court consisted of the privy council and the judges; men who all of them enjoyed their offices during pleasure: And when the prince himself was present, he was the sole judge, and all the others could only interpose with their advice. There needed but this one court in any government, to put an end to all regular, legal, and exact plans of liberty. For who durst set himself in opposition to the crown and ministry, or aspire to the character of being a patron of freedom, while exposed to so arbitrary a jurisdiction? I much question, whether any of the absolute monarchies in Europe contain, at present, so illegal and despotic a tribunal. While so many terrors hung over the people, no jury durst have acquitted a man, when the court was resolved to have him condemned. The practice also, of not confronting witnesses to the prisoner, gave the crown lawyers all imaginable advantage against him. And, indeed, there scarcely occurs an instance, during all these reigns, that the sovereign, or the ministers, were ever disappointed in the issue of a prosecution. Timid juries, and judges who held their offices during pleasure, never failed to second all the views of the crown. And as the practice was anciently common of fining, imprisoning, or otherwise punishing the jurors, merely at the discretion of the court, for finding a verdict contrary to the direction of these dependent judges; it is obvious, that juries were then no manner of security to the liberty of the subject.

The first paragraph of the act that abolished the Star Chamber repeats the clause on the right of a citizen to be judged by his peers:

WHEREAS by the great charter many times confirmed in parliament, it is enacted, That no freeman shall be taken or imprisoned, or disseised of his freehold or liberties, or free customs, or be outlawed or exiled or otherwise destroyed, and that the King will not pass upon him, or condemn him; but by lawful judgment of his peers, or by the law of the land ...

In 1670 two Quakers charged with unlawful assembly, William Penn and William Mead, were found not guilty by a jury. The judge then fined the jury for contempt of court for returning a verdict contrary to their own findings of fact and removed them to prison until the fine was paid. Edward Bushel, a member of the jury, nonetheless refused to pay the fine. Bushel petitioned the Court of Common Pleas for a writ of habeas corpus. The ruling in the Bushel's Case was that a jury could not be punished simply on account of the verdict it returned.

Many British colonies, including the United States, adopted the English common law system in which trial by jury is an important part. Jury trials in criminal cases were a protected right in the original United States Constitution and the Fifth, Sixth, and Seventh Amendments of the U.S. Constitution extend the right to a jury trial for both criminal and civil matters and a grand jury for serious cases.

== Role ==
In most common law jurisdictions, the jury is responsible for finding the facts of the case, while the judge determines the law. These "peers of the accused" are responsible for listening to a dispute, evaluating the evidence presented, deciding on the facts, and making a decision in accordance with the rules of law and their jury instructions. Typically, the jury only judges a verdict of guilty or not guilty, but the actual penalty is set by the judge.

=== Various verdicts ===
==== Russia ====
Following the judicial reform of Alexander II in Russia, unlike in modern jury trials, jurors decided not only whether the defendant was guilty or not guilty, but they had a third choice: "Guilty, but not to be punished", since Alexander II believed that justice without morality was wrong.

==== France ====
In France and some countries organized in the same fashion, the jury and several professional judges sit together to determine guilt first. Then, if guilt is determined, they decide the appropriate penalty.

=== Bench trials ===
Some jurisdictions with jury trials allow the defendant to waive their right to a jury trial, thus leading to a bench trial. Jury trials tend to occur only when a crime is considered serious. In some jurisdictions, such as France and Brazil, jury trials are reserved, and compulsory, for the most severe crimes and are not available for civil cases. In Brazil, trials by jury are applied in cases of voluntary crimes against life, such as first and second degree murder, forced abortion and instigation of suicide, even if only attempted. In others, jury trials are only available for criminal cases and very specific civil cases (malicious prosecution, civil fraud and false imprisonment).

In the United States, jury trials are available in both civil and criminal cases. In Canada, an individual charged with an indictable offence may elect to be tried by a judge alone in a provincial court, by judge alone in a superior court, or by judge and jury in a superior court; summary offences cannot be tried by jury. In England and Wales, offences are classified as summary, indictable, or either way; jury trials are not available for summary offences (using instead a summary proceeding with a panel of three lay magistrates or a district judge sitting alone), unless they are tried alongside indictable or either way offences that are themselves tried by jury, but the defendant has a right to demand a jury trial for either way offences. The situation is similar in Scotland; whereas in Northern Ireland even summary offences carry a right to jury trial, with some exceptions.

In the United States, because jury trials tend to be high profile, the general public tends to overestimate the frequency of jury trials. Approximately 150,000 jury trials are conducted in state courts annually, and an additional 5,000 jury trials are conducted in federal courts. Two-thirds of jury trials are criminal trials, while one-third are civil and "other" (e.g., family, municipal ordinance, traffic). Nevertheless, the vast majority of criminal cases are settled by plea bargain, which bypasses the jury trial.

Some commentators contend that the guilty-plea system (and the high costs incurred in trials) unfairly coerces defendants into relinquishing their right to a jury trial.

Others contend that there never was a golden age of jury trials, but rather that juries in the early nineteenth century (before the rise of plea bargaining) were "unwitting and reflexive, generally wasteful of public resources and, because of the absence of trained professionals, little more than slow guilty pleas themselves", and that the guilty-plea system that emerged in the latter half of the nineteenth century was a superior, more cost-effective method of achieving fair outcomes.

== Discussion ==
Robert Burns argues that the jury trial provides the discipline and rigor needed to limit raw discretion of judges and other bureaucrats. In particular, he praises the adversarial nature of the American system as a more effective way to uncover truths than the judge-led process in Europe. He further argues that being face-to-face in open court can help to bring humanity into the courtroom, by reminding decision-makers that everyone involved are humans with souls.

== In various countries ==
Overall, jury use has been increasing worldwide.

=== Argentina ===
Argentina is one of the first countries in Latin America to have implemented trial by jury. Although it has a civil law process, since November 2015, it has a jury system for serious criminal cases.

=== Australia ===
Section 80 of the Australian Constitution provides that: "The trial on indictment of any offence against any law of the Commonwealth shall be by jury, and every such trial shall be held in the State where the offence was committed, and if the offence was not committed within any State the trial shall be held at such place or places as the Parliament prescribes."

The first trials by civilian juries of 12 in the colony of New South Wales were held in 1824, following a decision of the NSW Supreme Court on 14 October 1824. The New South Wales Constitution Act 1828 (7 & 8 Geo. 4. c. 73) effectively terminated trial by jury for criminal matters. Jury trials for criminal matters revived with the passing of the Jury Trials Amending Act of 1833 (NSW) (2 William IV No 12).

==== Challenging potential jurors ====
The voir dire system of examining the jury pool before selection is not permitted in Australia as it violates the privacy of jurors. Therefore, though it exists, the right to challenge for cause during jury selection cannot be employed much. Peremptory challenges are usually based on the hunches of counsel and no reason is needed to use them. All Australian states allow for peremptory challenges in jury selection; however, the number of challenges granted to the counsels in each state are not all the same. Until 1987 New South Wales had twenty peremptory challenges for each side where the offence was murder, and eight for all other cases. In 1987 this was lowered to three peremptory challenges per side, the same amount allowed in South Australia. Eight peremptory challenges are allowed for both counsels for all offences in Queensland. Victoria, Tasmania and the Northern Territory allow for six. Western Australia allows three peremptory challenges per side unless there is more than one accused in which case the prosecution can peremptorily challenge three times the number of accused and each accused has three peremptory challenges.

==== Majority and unanimous verdicts in criminal trials ====
In Australia, majority verdicts are allowed in South Australia, Victoria, Western Australia, Tasmania, the Northern Territory, New South Wales and Queensland, while the ACT requires unanimous verdicts.

Since 1927, South Australia has permitted majority verdicts of 11-1 (or 10-1 or 9-1 in cases where the jury has been reduced) in criminal trials if a unanimous verdict cannot be reached in four hours. These are accepted in all cases except for guilty verdicts if the defendant is on trial for murder or treason.

Victoria has accepted majority verdicts with the same conditions since 1994, though deliberations must have gone for at least six hours before a majority verdict can be made.

Western Australia accepted majority verdicts in 1957 for all trials except where the crime is murder or has a maximum penalty of life imprisonment: a 10-2 verdict is accepted.

Majority verdicts of 10-2 have been allowed in Tasmania since 1936 for all cases, except murder and treason, if a unanimous decision has not been made within two hours. Since 1943, verdicts of not guilty for murder and treason have also been included, but must be deliberated for six hours.

The Northern Territory has allowed majority verdicts of 10-2, 10-1 and 9-1 since 1963 for all charges. Deliberation must go for at least six hours before delivering a majority verdict.

The Queensland Jury Act 1995 (s 59F) allows majority verdicts for all crimes except for murder and other offences that carry a life sentence, although only 11-1 or 10-1 majorities are allowed.

Majority verdicts were introduced in New South Wales in 2006. In New South Wales, a majority verdict can only be returned if the jury consists of at least 11 jurors, and the deliberation has occurred for at least eight hours or for a period that the court considers reasonable having regard to the nature and complexity of the case. Additionally, the court must be satisfied through examination of one or more of the jurors on oath that a unanimous verdict will not be reached if further deliberation were to occur.

=== Austria ===
Austria, in common with a number of European civil law jurisdictions, retains elements of trial by jury in serious criminal cases.

=== Belgium ===
Belgium, in common with a number of European civil law jurisdictions, retains the trial by jury through the Court of Assize for serious criminal cases and for political crimes and for press delicts (except those based on racism or xenophobia), and for crimes of international law, such as genocide and crime against humanity.

=== Brazil ===
Brazil instated jury trial since 1822, surviving seven constitutions. It is limited to criminal law, specifically to intentional crimes against life.

=== Canada ===
Under Canadian law, a person has the constitutional right to a jury trial for all crimes punishable by five years of imprisonment or more. The Criminal Code also provides for the right to a jury trial for most indictable offences, including those punishable by less than five years' imprisonment, though the right is only constitutionally enshrined for those offences punishable by five years' imprisonment or more. Generally, it is the accused person who is entitled to elect whether their trial will proceed by judge alone or by judge and jury; however, for the most severe criminal offences—murder, treason, intimidating Parliament, inciting to mutiny, sedition, piracy, crimes against humanity and war crimes—trial by jury is mandatory unless the prosecution consents to trial by judge alone.

==== Jury panel exhaustion ====
642 (1) If a full jury and alternate jurors cannot be provided, the court may order the sheriff or other proper officer, at the request of the prosecutor, to summon without delay as many people as the court directs for the purpose of providing a full jury and alternate jurors.

(2) Jurors may be summoned under subsection (1) by word of mouth, if necessary.

(3) The names of the people who are summoned under this Section shall be added to the general panel for the purposes of the trial, and the same proceedings with respect to calling, challenging, excusing and directing them shall apply to them.

According to the case of R v Mid-Valley Tractor Sales Limited (1995 CarswellNB 313), there are limitations on the powers granted by Section 642. These powers are conferred specifically upon the judge, and the section does not confer a further discretion to delegate that power to others, such as the sheriff's officer, even with the consent of counsel. The Court said that to hold otherwise would nullify the rights of the accused and the prosecution to object to a person being excused inappropriately, and may also interfere with the rights of the parties to challenge for cause. The selection of an impartial jury is the basis of a fair trial.

The Supreme Court of Canada also held in Basarabas and Spek v The Queen (1982 SCR 730) that the right of an accused to be present in court during the whole of his trial includes the jury selection process.

In Tran v The Queen (1994 2 SCR 951), it was held that an accused only has to show that they were excluded from a part of the trial that affected their vital interests, they do not have to demonstrate actual prejudice, just the potential for prejudice. As well, a valid waiver of such a right must be clear, unequivocal and done with full knowledge of the rights that the procedure was enacted to protect, as well as the effect that the waiver will have on those rights.

=== China ===
==== Hong Kong ====
Hong Kong, as a former British colony, has a common law legal system. Article 86 of Hong Kong's Basic Law, which came into force on 1 July 1997 following the handover of Hong Kong from Britain to China provides: "The principle of trial by jury previously practised in Hong Kong shall be maintained."

Criminal trials in the High Court are by jury. The juries are generally made of seven members, who can return a verdict based on a majority of five.

There are no jury trials in the District Court, which can impose a sentence of up to seven years' imprisonment. This is despite the fact that all court rooms in the District Court have jury boxes. The lack of juries in the District Court has been severely criticized. Clive Grossman SC in a commentary in 2009 said conviction rates were "approaching those of North Korea".

Many complex commercial cases are prosecuted in the District Court rather than before a jury in the High Court. In 2009, Lily Chiang, former chairwoman of the Hong Kong General Chamber of Commerce, lost an application to have her case transferred from the District Court to the High Court for a jury trial. Justice Wright in the Court of First Instance held that there was no absolute right to a trial by jury and that the "decision as to whether an indictable offence be tried in the Court of First Instance by a judge and jury or in the District Court by a judge alone is the prerogative of the Secretary for Justice." Chiang issued a statement at the time saying "she was disappointed with the judgment because she has been deprived of a jury trial, an opportunity to be judged by her fellow citizens and the constitutional benefit protected by the Basic Law".

In civil cases in the Court of First Instance jury trials are available for defamation, false imprisonment, malicious prosecution or seduction unless the court orders otherwise. A jury can return a majority verdict in a civil case.

The government can issue a judge-only trial order under the Hong Kong national security law, in cases which contain "involvement of foreign elements", "personal safety of jurors and their family members" or "risk of perverting the course of justice if the trial is conducted with a jury".

=== Democratic Republic of the Congo ===
==== Kuba Kingdom ====
In Kuba Kingdom in what is now the Democratic Republic of the Congo, trial by jury was established independently prior to the arrival of Europeans in 1884.

=== France ===
In France, a defendant is entitled to a jury trial only when prosecuted for a felony (crime in French). Crimes encompass all offenses that carry a penalty of at least 10 years' imprisonment (for natural persons) or a fine of €75,000 (for legal persons). The only court that tries by jury is the cour d'assises, in which three professional judges sit together with six or nine jurors (on appeal). Conviction requires a two-thirds majority (four or six votes).

=== Greece ===
The country that originated the concept of the jury trial retains it in an unusual form. The Constitution of Greece and Code of criminal procedure provide that felonies (Greek: Κακουργήματα) are tried by a "mixed court" composed of three professional judges, including the President of the Court, and four lay judges who decide the facts, and the appropriate penalty if they convict. Certain felonies, such as terrorism, are exempt, due to their nature, from the jurisdiction of the "mixed courts" and are tried instead by the Court of Appeals both in first and second instance.

=== Hungary ===
Hungary used a jury system from 1897 to 1919. Since 1949, Hungary uses the mixed court system. According to the Fundamental Law of Hungary, "non-professional judges shall also participate in the administration of justice in the cases and ways specified in an Act." In these cases, the court adjudicates in a panel which is composed of 1 professional judge as chair of the panel and 2 lay judges or 2 professional judges and 3 lay judges. Lay judges are elected by city councils and can be Hungarian citizens between the age of 30 and 70 years who have not been convicted. Non-professional judges have the same rights and responsibilities as professional judges, meaning that if they vote against the professional judge(s), their vote will decide the verdict. According to procedural laws, the youngest judge votes first and the chair of the panel votes last in case they reach a verdict through a vote.

=== India ===
The history of jury trials in India dates back to the period of European colonization. In 1665, a petit jury in Madras composed of twelve English and Portuguese jurors acquitted a Mrs. Ascentia Dawes, who was on trial for the murder of her enslaved servant. During the period of Company rule in India, jury trials within a dual-court system territories were implemented in Indian territories under East India Company (EIC) control. In Presidency towns (such as Calcutta, Bombai and Madras), Crown Courts employed juries to judge European and Indian defendants in criminal cases. Outside of Presidency towns, Company Courts staffed by EIC officials judged both criminal and civil cases without the use of a jury.

In 1860, after the British Crown assumed control over the EIC's possessions in India, the Indian Penal Code was adopted. A year later, the Code of Criminal Procedure was adopted in 1861. These new regulations stipulated that criminal juries were only mandatory in the High courts of Presidency towns; in all other parts of British India, they were optional and rarely utilized. In cases where the defendants were either European or American, at least half of the jury was required to be European or American men, with the justification given that juries in these cases had to be "acquainted with [the defendant's] feelings and dispositions."

During the 20th century, the jury system in British India came under criticism from both colonial officials and independence activists. The system received no mentions in the 1950 Indian Constitution and frequently went unimplemented in many Indian legal jurisdictions after independence in 1947. In 1958, the Law Commission of India recommended its abolition in the fourteenth report that the commission submitted to the Indian government. Jury trials in India were gradually abolished during the 1960s, culminating in the 1973 Criminal Procedure Code, which remains in effect into the 21st century.

Parsis in India are legally permitted to use jury trials to decide divorces wherein randomly selected jurors (referred to in the Indian legal system as "delegates") from the local Parsi community are used to decide the outcome of the matrimonial disputes in question during civil trials. This jury system consists of a mixture of common law juries and the Panchayati raj form of local government, and was first implemented during the period of British rule, with the colonial administration passing the Parsi Marriage and Divorce Act in 1936. Post-independence, it was amended by the Indian government in 1988.

=== Ireland ===
In the Republic of Ireland, a common law jurisdiction, jury trials are available for criminal cases before the Circuit Court, Central Criminal Court and defamation cases, consisting of twelve jurors.

Juries only decide questions of fact; they have no role in criminal sentencing in criminal cases however they do have a role in awarding damages in defamation cases. It is not necessary that a jury be unanimous in its verdict. In civil cases, a verdict may be reached by a majority of nine of the twelve members. In a criminal case, a verdict need not be unanimous where there are not fewer than eleven jurors if ten of them agree on a verdict after considering the case for a reasonable time.

Juries are selected from a jury panel, which is picked at random by the county registrar from the electoral register. The principal statute regulating the selection, obligations and conduct of juries is the Juries Act 1976 as amended by the Civil Law (Miscellaneous Provisions) Act 2008, which scrapped the upper age limit of 70. Juries are not paid, nor do they receive travel expenses. They do receive lunch for the days that they are serving; however, for jurors in employment, their employer is required to pay them as if they were present at work.

For certain terrorist and organised crime offences the Director of Public Prosecutions may issue a certificate that the accused be tried by the Special Criminal Court composed of three judges instead of a jury, one from the District Court, Circuit Court and High Court.

=== Italy ===
The Corte d'Assise is composed of 2 judges and 6 laypersons chosen at random among Italian citizens 30 to 65 years old. Only serious crimes like murder can be tried by the Corte d'Assise.

=== Japan ===
On May 28, 2004, the Diet of Japan enacted a law requiring selected citizens to take part in criminal court trials of certain severe crimes to make decisions together with professional judges, both on guilt and on the sentence. These citizens are called saiban-in (裁判員 "lay judge"). Convictions and death sentences require the concurrence of both a majority of all judges and at least one professional judge.

The saiban-in system was implemented in May 2009.

=== Malaysia ===
Malaysia abolished trials by jury on 1 January 1995. The impartiality of jury trials had been brought into question for several years prior, but their abolition was expedited by the notorious Mona Fandey case in 1993. The sensational nature of the crime heightened concerns that jury verdicts could be coloured by emotions and media bias.

=== New Zealand ===
The New Zealand Bill of Rights Act 1990 provides a defendant with the right to a jury trial if they are charged with a criminal offence punishable by two years' imprisonment or more. For most offences, the defendant can choose to forego a jury trial in favour of a judge-alone (bench) trial. Serious "category 4" offences such as murder, manslaughter and treason are always tried by jury, with some exceptions. Civil jury trials are restricted to cases involving defamation, false imprisonment or malicious prosecution.

New Zealand previously required jury verdicts to be passed unanimously, but since the passing of the Criminal Procedure Bill in 2009 the Juries Act 1981 has permitted verdicts to be passed by a majority of one less than the full jury (that is an 11–1 or a 10–1 majority) under certain circumstances.

=== Norway ===
Norway has a system where the lower courts (tingrett) is set with a judge and two lay judges, or in bigger cases two judges and three lay judges. All of these judges convict or acquit, and set sentences. Simple majority is required in all cases, which means that the lay-judges are always in control.

In the higher court/appellate court (lagmannsrett) there is a jury (lagrette) of 10 members, which need a minimum of seven votes to be able to convict. The judges have no say in the jury deliberations, but jury instructions are given by the chief judge (lagmann) in each case to the jury before deliberations. The voir-dire is usually set with 16 prospective jurors, which the prosecution and defence may dismiss the six persons they do not desire to serve on the jury.

This court (lagmannsretten) is administered by a three-judge panel (usually one lagmann and two lagdommere), and if seven or more jury members want to convict, the sentence is set in a separate proceeding, consisting of the three judges and the jury foreman (lagrettens ordfører) and three other members of the jury chosen by ballot. This way the laymen are in control of both the conviction and sentencing, as simple majority is required in sentencing.

The three-judge panel can set aside a jury conviction or acquittal if there has been an obvious miscarriage of justice. In that event, the case is settled by three judges and four lay-judges.

In May 2015, the Norwegian Parliament asked the government to bring an end to jury trials, replacing them with a bench trial (meddomsrett) consisting of two law-trained judges and five lay judges (lekdommere). This has now been fully implemented as of March 2021.

=== Russia ===
In the judiciary of Russia, for serious crimes the accused has the option of a jury trial consisting of 12 jurors. The number of jury trials remains small, at about 600 per year, out of about 1 million trials. A juror must be at least 25 years old, legally competent, and without a criminal record. The 12 jurors are selected by the prosecution and defense from a list of 30–40 eligible candidates. The Constitution of Russia stipulates that, until the abolition of the death penalty, all defendants in a case that may result in a death sentence are entitled to a jury trial. Lawmakers are continuously chipping away at what types of criminal offenses merit a jury trial.

They are similar to common law juries, and unlike lay judges, in that they sit separately from the judges and decide questions of fact alone while the judge determines questions of law. They must return unanimous verdicts during the first 3 hours of deliberation, but may return majority verdicts after that, with 6 jurors being enough to acquit. They may also request that the judge show leniency in sentencing.

Juries have granted acquittals in 15–20% of cases, compared with less than 1% in cases decided by judges. Juries may be dismissed and skeptical juries have been dismissed on the verge of verdicts, and acquittals are frequently overturned by higher courts.

Trial by jury was first introduced in the Russian Empire as a result of the Judicial reform of Alexander II in 1864, and abolished after the October Revolution in 1917. They were reintroduced in the Russian Federation in 1993, and extended to another 69 regions in 2003. Its reintroduction was opposed by the Prosecutor General.

=== Singapore ===
Singapore fully abolished the jury system in 1969, building upon a 1959 decision to remove jury trials for non-capital offenses. Prime Minister Lee Kuan Yew, a former trial lawyer, frequently articulated his distrust of the system, stating, "I had no faith in a system that allowed the superstition, ignorance, biases, and prejudices of seven jurymen to determine guilt or innocence." He maintained that in a multicultural society, it was dangerously easy for defense lawyers to sway juries by appealing to their latent racial or religious biases rather than the evidence at hand.

Lee's skepticism was rooted in his early legal career, during which he successfully defended four clients accused of murdering a British Royal Air Force officer and his family. He recounted in his memoirs how he "worked on the weaknesses of the jury—their biases, their prejudices, their reluctance really to find four Muslims guilty of killing in cold blood." Although he secured an acquittal, he noted that the judge was "thoroughly disgusted" by the verdict. Lee admitted that he felt "quite sick" afterward, realizing that while he had fulfilled his professional duty, he had facilitated a "profound miscarriage of justice", convincing him the jury system was "incongruous with the requirements of a fair and effective judiciary."

=== South Korea ===
Korean citizen participation trial was introduced to criminal cases by Civil Participation in Criminal Trials Act in 2008. In the citizen participation trial, citizens can participate as jurors in order that democratic legitimacy and trust can be enhanced. Citizen participation trial means a criminal trial that citizens participate as jurors or prospective jurors. Citizens who are selected as jurors are given an opportunity to participate in the trial by delivering a verdict on the defendant's guilt or innocence and discussing about the appropriate punishment to be imposed for a defendant who has been found guilty. A citizen participation trial is conducted only when the defendant requests it. Even if the defendant applies for a citizen participation trial, the court may, at its discretion, exclude the case from such a proceeding if it deems the trial inappropriate.

For cases eligible for citizen participation trial, see

The court seeks to enhance juror attendance rates and promote diversity in jury composition in order to ensure the fairness of trials. The court provides jurors with daily allowances and travel expenses, the amount of which varies depending on the time the trial concludes. Individuals who attend only the jury selection session but are not selected as jurors receive 60,000 KRW.

Those who are selected as formal jurors or prospective jurors receive the following money:

– 120,000 KRW if the trial concludes before 6:00 p.m.;

– 160,000 KRW if it concludes before 9:00 p.m.;

– 200,000 KRW if it concludes before midnight; and

– 240,000 KRW if it concludes after midnight.

==== Compare jury system with lay judge system ====
Under the jury system, jurors consisting of ordinary citizens take part in the trial and deliver a verdict on guilt or innocence independently of professional judges, and the judge is bound by the verdict. Under the lay judge system, lay judges consisting of ordinary citizens join the bench with professional judges and have equal authority in determining matters of fact and law.

The Korean participatory trial system is distinctive in that it incorporates aspects of both the jury system and the lay judge system, modifying them to accommodate the specific circumstances of Korea.

==== Features ====
- Jury conducts their deliberations independently, without the involvement of the judge, and shall reach a unanimous verdict. In cases where a unanimous verdict cannot be reached, the jury may reach a verdict by majority vote after listening to the judge's opinion.
- While jurors deliberate on sentencing with the presiding judge, they do not take part in the decision on sentencing by vote but merely state their opinions.
- The jurors' verdict does not bind the court and has only an advisory effect.

==== Shadow Jury ====
The shadow jury, organized independently of the formal jury in a citizen participation trial, attends the entire proceedings and may conduct deliberations and deliver a verdict on guilt or innocence, along with providing opinions on sentencing. However, the court does not take the shadow jurors' verdicts into account in rendering its judgment. The fact that their deliberations may be made public distinguishes them from the formal jurors.

Ordinary citizens, acting as shadow jurors, are able to observe the vivid courtroom debates of real cases and deliberate on issues such as guilt, innocence, and sentencing in a manner similar to actual jury deliberations.

==== Jury Instructions ====
- Jury must not discuss the case with one another or with anyone else.
- Before deliberations begin, jurors must not express or discuss their opinions about the case.
- Jurors must not collect or investigate any information about the case outside the court proceedings.
- If a juror becomes aware of any attempt by anyone to improperly influence the performance of jury duties, it must be reported to the court immediately.
- Jurors must not leave the courtroom or the deliberation room without the judge's permission.
- Jurors must not disclose any opinions of the judge or fellow jurors, or the distribution of those opinions, learned during deliberations, verdict discussions, or any related process.

==== Procedure for Jury selection ====
The jury selection procedure refers to the process by which a certain number of prospective jurors are randomly drawn from the list of potential jurors prepared by each level of court. The court conducts questioning of the prospective jurors who appear in court to verify their qualifications and to determine whether they are capable of rendering an impartial judgment. Through this process, the court selects both formal jurors and prospective jurors. A prospective juror who is deemed unqualified to serve as a juror, or who is found to possess prejudice or bias regarding the case that would make it difficult to render an impartial verdict, may not be selected as a juror. The prosecutor and the defense counsel may each exercise a limited number of peremptory challenges against prospective jurors without stating any reason. The identities of the jurors and alternate jurors will be disclosed only after the conclusion of the arguments. When the trial begins, the jurors shall take an oath in accordance with the law to faithfully and impartially perform their duties.

==== Precedents of Citizen Participation Trial ====
- The Pesticide Poisoning Case in Sangju Involving Contaminated Drinks

A citizen participation trial was held at the Daegu District Court for five days starting on December 7. A total of 300 residents within the court's jurisdiction were selected as potential jurors, and on December 7, seven jurors and two prospective jurors were finally chosen. In the first trial, the jury unanimously returned a guilty verdict. The court sentenced the defendant to life imprisonment both in the first and second instances.

==== Status ====
Between 2008 and 2022, 240,883 cases were eligible for citizen participation trials, of which 9,439 were filed. The application rate is 3.9%. Among 9,240 disposed cases, trials were conducted with citizen participation in 2,894 cases. The implementation rate is 31.3%.

Homicide cases record the highest rate of application for citizen participation trials among all types of offenses.

After 2020, the number of citizen participation trials declined to fewer than 100 cases per year across all categories of crime.

From 2008 to 2022, the average period from the filing of a case to the first trial date was 112.9 days. During the same period, proceedings were conducted faster than the average duration of first-instance cases before the main division of the district court (119.4 days for detained defendants and 175.6 days for non-detained defendants).

Between 2008 and 2022, 2,894 cases, corresponding to 93.6%, showed concordance between jury verdicts and court decisions.

=== South Africa ===
The jury system was abolished in South Africa in 1969 by the Abolition of Juries Act, 1969. The last jury trial to be heard was in the District of Kimberley. Some judicial experts had argued that a system of whites-only juries (as was the system at that time) was inherently prejudicial to 'non-white' defendants (the introduction of nonracial juries would have been a political impossibility at that time). More recently it has been argued that, apart from being a racially divided country, South African society was, and still is, characterised by significant class differences and disparities of income and wealth that could make re-introducing the jury system problematic. Arguments for and against the re-introduction of a jury system have been discussed by South African constitutional expert Professor Pierre de Vos in the article "Do we need a jury system?" On 28 March 2014, the Oscar Pistorius trial was adjourned due to the illness of one of the two assessors that assist the judge on questions of fact (rather than law), in place of the jury, to reach a verdict. The legal system in the UK sees no reason to block extradition on this, as witnessed in the Shrien Dewani case.

=== Sweden ===
In Sweden, juries are uncommon; the public is represented in the courts by means of lay judges (nämndemän). However, the defendant has the right to a jury trial in the lower court (tingsrätt) when accused of an offence against the fundamental laws on freedom of expression and freedom of the press. If a person is accused of e.g. libel or incitement to ethnic or racial hatred, in a medium covered by the fundamental laws (e.g. a printed paper or a radio programme), they have the right to have the accusation tried by a jury of nine jurors. This applies also in civil (tort) cases under the fundamental laws. A majority of at least six jurors (out of nine) must find that the defendant has committed the alleged crime. If it does not, the defendant is acquitted or, in a civil case, held not liable. If such a majority of the jurors hold that said crime has in fact been committed, this finding is not legally binding for the court; thus, the court (three judges out of five) can still acquit the defendant or find him/her not liable. A jury acquittal may not be overruled after appeal, unlike a not guilty verdict in the district court. Hence, both the layman majority and the jury must convict to sentence a culprit; however, if the deciding two-thirds jury majority approves and the district court finds the defendant not guilty, the not guilty verdict may still be appealed to the Court of Appeals where, conversely, the professional judges outvotes the layman judges. (Should a case be appealed to the Supreme Court of Sweden, only professional judges decide, and may impose a sentence or re-impose a sentence imposed by the district court but quashed by the Court of Appeals.) In such a case, the jury provides a unique lock on the ability of the professional judges, upon appeal, outvoting the layman judges.

In Swedish civil process, the "English rule" applies to court costs. Earlier, a court disagreeing with a jury acquittal could, when deciding on the matter of such costs, set aside the English rule, and instead use the American rule, that each party bears its own expense of litigation. This practice was declared to violate the rule of presumption of innocence according to article 6.2. of the European Convention on Human Rights, by the Supreme Court of Sweden, in 2012.

=== Switzerland ===
As of 2008, only the code of criminal procedure of the Canton of Geneva provides for genuine jury trials. Several other cantons—Vaud, Neuchâtel, Zürich and Ticino—provide for courts composed of both professional judges and laymen (Schöffengerichte / tribunaux d'échevins). Because the unified Swiss Code of Criminal Procedure (set to enter into force in 2011) does not provide for jury trials or lay judges, however, they are likely to be abolished in the near future.

=== Taiwan ===
The Citizen Judges Act (國民法官法) was passed by the Legislative Yuan on July 22, 2022, promulgated by the President on August 12 and was implemented on January 1, 2023. Under the act, Lay judges in Taiwan are to be randomly selected as citizen judges who would participate in trial proceedings and adjudicate cases alongside professional judges in certain felony cases. The citizen judge system is based on Japan's saiban-in system, which also resembles a lay judge system.

=== Ukraine ===
The judiciary of Ukraine allows jury trials for criminal cases where the sentence can reach life imprisonment if the accused so wishes. But this seldom happens. A jury is not formed from random citizens, but only from those who have previously applied for this role who do meet certain criteria.

=== United Kingdom ===
The United Kingdom consists of three separate legal jurisdictions, but there are some features common to all of them. In particular there is seldom anything like the U.S. voir dire system; jurors are usually just accepted without question. Controversially, in England there has been some screening in sensitive security cases, but the Scottish courts have firmly set themselves against any form of jury vetting.

==== England and Wales ====
In England and Wales (which have the same legal system), everyone accused of an offence which carries more than six months' imprisonment has a right to trial by jury. Minor ("summary") criminal cases are heard without a jury in the Magistrates' Courts. Middle-ranking ("triable either way") offences may be tried by magistrates or the defendant may elect trial by jury in the Crown Court. Serious ("indictable-only") offences, however, must be tried before a jury in the Crown Court. Juries sit in few civil cases, being restricted to false imprisonment, malicious prosecution, and civil fraud (unless ordered otherwise by a judge). Juries also sit in coroner's courts for more contentious inquests. All criminal juries consist of 12 jurors, those in a County Court having 8 jurors and Coroner's Court juries having between 7 and 11 members. Jurors must be between 18 and 75 years of age, and are selected at random from the register of voters. In the past a unanimous verdict was required. This has been changed so that, if the jury fails to agree after a given period, at the discretion of the judge they may reach a verdict by a 10–2 majority. This was designed to make it more difficult for jury tampering to succeed.

In 1999 the Home Secretary Jack Straw introduced a controversial bill to limit the right to trial by jury. This became the Criminal Justice Act 2003, which sought to remove the right to trial by jury for cases involving jury tampering or complex fraud. The provision for trial without jury to circumvent jury tampering succeeded and came into force in 2007; the provision for complex fraud cases was defeated. Lord Goldsmith, the then Attorney General, then pressed forward with the Fraud (Trials Without a Jury) Bill in Parliament, which sought to abolish jury trials in major criminal fraud trials. The Bill was subject to sharp criticism from both sides of the House of Commons before passing its second Commons reading in November 2006 but was defeated in the Lords in March 2007.

The trial for the first serious offence to be tried without a jury in 350 years was allowed to go ahead in 2009. Three previous trials of the defendants, who had committed armed robbery at Heathrow Airport in 2004, had been halted because of jury tampering and the Lord Chief Justice, Lord Judge, cited cost and the additional burden on the jurors as reasons to proceed without a jury. Previously in cases where jury tampering was a concern the jurors were sometimes closeted in a hotel for the duration of the trial. Liberty director of policy Isabella Sankey said that "This is a dangerous precedent. The right to jury trial isn't just a hallowed principle but a practice that ensures that one class of people don't sit in judgement over another and the public have confidence in an open and representative justice system." The trial started in 2010, with the four defendants convicted on 31 March 2010 by Mr Justice Treacy at the Old Bailey.

In November 2025, Justice Secretary David Lammy proposed limiting the use of juries to serious crimes such as rape, murder and manslaughter in order to clear the backlog of cases, a move that has been widely criticised by other political parties and senior judges. In July 2026, new Prime Minister Andy Burnham signalled that the proposal was being scrapped.

==== Gibraltar ====
Being a Common Law jurisdiction, Gibraltar retains jury trial in a similar manner to that found in England and Wales, the exception being that juries consist of nine lay people, rather than twelve.

==== Scotland ====
In Scots law the jury system has some similarities with England but some important differences; in particular, there are juries of 15 in criminal trials, with a guilty verdict requiring a two-thirds majority.

==== Northern Ireland ====
In Northern Ireland, the role of the jury trial is roughly similar to England and Wales, except that jury trials have been replaced in cases of alleged terrorist offences by courts where the judge sits alone, known as Diplock courts. Diplock courts are common in Northern Ireland for crimes connected to terrorism.

Diplock courts were created in the 1970s during The Troubles, to phase out Operation Demetrius internments, and because of the argument that juries were intimidated, though this is disputed. The Diplock courts were shut in 2007, but between 1 August 2008 and 31 July 2009, 13 non-jury trials were held, down from 29 in the previous year, and 300 trials per year at their peak.

=== United States ===
The availability of a trial by jury in U.S. jurisdictions varies. Because the United States legal system separated from that of the English one at the time of the American Revolution, the types of proceedings that use juries depends on whether such cases were tried by jury under English common law at that time rather than the methods used in English courts now. For example, at the time, English "courts of law" tried cases of torts or private law for monetary damages using juries, but "courts of equity" that tried civil cases seeking an injunction or another form of usually non-monetary relief did not. As a result, this practice continues in American civil laws, but in modern English law, only criminal proceedings and some inquests are likely to be heard by a jury.

A distinctive feature of jury trials in the United States is that verdicts in criminal cases must be unanimous.

The right to a trial by jury is contained in Article Three of the United States Constitution, which states in part, "The Trial of all Crimes...shall be by Jury". The right was expanded with the Sixth Amendment to the United States Constitution, which states in part, "In all criminal prosecutions, the accused shall enjoy the right to a speedy and public trial, by an impartial jury". Due to the Fourteenth Amendment, these rights also apply to the states through incorporation. Most states' constitutions also grant the right of trial by jury in lesser criminal matters, though most have abrogated that right in offenses punishable by fine only. The Supreme Court has ruled that if imprisonment is for six months or less, trial by jury is not required, meaning a state may choose whether or not to permit trial by jury in such cases. Under the Federal Rules of Criminal Procedure, if the defendant is entitled to a jury trial, they may waive their right to have a jury, but both the government (prosecution) and court must consent to the waiver. Several states require jury trials for all crimes, "petty" or not.

In the cases Apprendi v. New Jersey (2000), and Blakely v. Washington (2004), the Supreme Court of the United States held that a criminal defendant has a right to a jury trial not only on the question of guilt or innocence, but on any fact used to increase the defendant's sentence beyond the maximum otherwise allowed by statutes or sentencing guidelines. This invalidated the procedure in many states and the federal courts that allowed sentencing enhancement based on "a preponderance of evidence", where enhancement could be based on the judge's findings alone. A jury must be unanimous for either a guilty or not guilty decision. A hung jury results in the defendants release; however, charges against the defendant are not dropped and can be reinstated if the government so chooses.

Jurors in some states are selected through voter registration and drivers' license lists. A form is sent to prospective jurors to pre-qualify them by asking the recipient to answer questions about citizenship, disabilities, ability to understand the English language, and whether they have any conditions that would excuse them from being a juror. If they are deemed qualified, a summons is issued.

English common law and the United States Constitution recognize the right to a jury trial to be a fundamental civil liberty or civil right that allows the accused to choose whether to be judged by judges or a jury.

In the United States, it is understood that juries usually weigh the evidence and testimony to determine questions of fact, while judges usually rule on questions of law, although the dissenting justices in the Supreme Court case Sparf v. United States (1895), generally considered the pivotal case concerning the rights and powers of the jury, declared: "It is our deep and settled conviction, confirmed by a re-examination of the authorities that the jury, upon the general issue of guilty or not guilty in a criminal case, have the right, as well as the power, to decide, according to their own judgment and consciences, all questions, whether of law or of fact, involved in that issue." Jury determination of questions of law, sometimes called jury nullification, cannot be overturned by a judge if doing so would violate legal protections against double jeopardy. Although a judge can throw out a guilty verdict if it was not supported by the evidence, a jurist has no authority to override a verdict that favors a defendant.

It was established in Bushel's Case that a judge cannot order the jury to convict, no matter how strong the evidence is. In civil cases, a special verdict can be given, but in criminal cases a general verdict is rendered, because requiring a special verdict could apply pressure to the jury, and because of the jury's "historic function", in the words of United States v. Ogull (S.D.N.Y. 1957), "of tempering rules of law by common sense brought to bear upon the facts of a specific case". For this reason, Justice Black and Justice Douglas disapproved of special interrogatories even in civil cases.

There has been much debate about the advantages and disadvantages of the jury system, the competence or lack thereof of jurors as fact-finders, and the uniformity or capriciousness of the justice they administer. The jury has been described by one author as "an exciting and gallant experiment in the conduct of serious human affairs". Because they are fact-finders, juries are sometimes expected to perform a role similar to a lie detector, especially when presented with testimony from witnesses.

A civil jury is typically made up of 6 to 12 persons. In a civil case, the role of the jury is to listen to the evidence presented at a trial, to decide whether the defendant injured the plaintiff or otherwise failed to fulfill a legal duty to the plaintiff, and to determine what the compensation or penalty should be.

A criminal jury is usually made up of 12 members, though fewer may sit on cases involving lesser offenses. Criminal juries decide whether the defendant committed the crime as charged. In several southern states, the jury sets punishment, while in most states and at the federal level, it is set by the judge.

Prior to 2020, under most states' laws, verdicts in criminal cases had to be unanimous, with the exception of Oregon and Louisiana. In Oregon, a 10–2 majority was enough to reach a verdict, except for guilty verdicts for capital crimes, which required unanimity. Louisiana also did not require unanimous juries in serious felony cases until passage of a state constitutional amendment that required unanimity for crimes committed after 2018. However, in Ramos v. Louisiana, decided in April 2020, the Supreme Court of the United States ruled that convictions for serious offenses require unanimity, overturning Oregon's and Louisiana's prior allowances for split decisions.

In civil cases, the law (or the agreement of the parties) may permit a non-unanimous verdict.

A "specific finding" pertains to a type of verdict rendered in a jury trial. A judge may direct questions at the jury to be answered as part of its deliberations. These questions are meant to guide the jury through the facts of the case or the elements of each claim that must be proven. The answers returned by the jury, the specific findings, are then used to resolve the case as a matter of law.

A jury's deliberations are conducted in private, out of sight and hearing of the judge, litigants, witnesses, and others in the courtroom.

Not every case is eligible for a jury trial. For example, in the majority of U.S. states there is no right to a jury trial in family law actions not involving a termination of parental rights, such as divorce and custody modifications. As of 1978, eleven U.S. states allow juries in any aspect of divorce litigation: Colorado, Georgia, Illinois, Louisiana, Maine, Nevada, New York, North Carolina, Tennessee, Texas and Wisconsin. Most of these limit the right to a jury to try issues regarding grounds or entitlement for divorce only. Texas provides jury trial rights most broadly, including even the right to a jury trial on questions regarding child custody. However, anyone who is charged with a criminal offense has a Constitutional right to a trial by jury.

==== Civil trial procedure ====
The right to trial by jury in a civil case in federal court is addressed by the Seventh Amendment. Importantly, however, the Seventh Amendment does not guarantee a right to a civil jury trial in state courts (although most state constitutions guarantee such a right). The Seventh Amendment provides: "In Suits at common law, where the value in controversy shall exceed twenty dollars, the right of trial by jury shall be preserved, and no fact tried by a jury shall be otherwise re-examined in any Court of the United States, than according to the rules of the common law." In Joseph Story's 1833 treatise Commentaries on the Constitution of the United States, he wrote, "[I]t is a most important and valuable amendment; and places upon the high ground of constitutional right the inestimable privilege of a trial by jury in civil cases, a privilege scarcely inferior to that in criminal cases, which is conceded by all to be essential to political and civil liberty."

The Seventh Amendment does not guarantee or create any right to a jury trial; rather, it preserves the right to jury trial in the federal courts that existed in 1791 at common law. In this context, common law means the legal environment the United States inherited from England. In England in 1791, civil actions were divided into actions at law and actions in equity. Actions at law had a right to a jury, actions in equity did not. Federal Rules of Civil Procedure Rule 2 says "[t]here is one form of action—the civil action", which abolishes the legal/equity distinction. Today, in actions that would have been "at law" in 1791, there is a right to a jury; in actions that would have been "in equity" in 1791, there is no right to a jury. However, Federal Rule of Civil Procedure 39(c) allows a court to use one at its discretion. To determine whether the action would have been legal or equitable in 1791, one must first look at the type of action and whether such an action was considered "legal" or "equitable" at that time. Next, the relief being sought must be examined. Monetary damages alone were purely a legal remedy, and thus entitled to a jury. Non-monetary remedies such as injunctions, rescission, and specific performance were all equitable remedies, and thus up to the judge's discretion, not a jury. In Beacon Theaters, Inc. v. Westover (1959), the US Supreme Court discussed the right to a jury, holding that when both equitable and legal claims are brought, the right to a jury trial still exists for the legal claim, which would be decided by a jury before the judge ruled on the equitable claim.

There is not a United States constitutional right under the Seventh Amendment to a jury trial in state courts, but in practice, almost every state except Louisiana, which has a civil law legal tradition, permits jury trials in civil cases in state courts on substantially the same basis that they are allowed under the Seventh Amendment in federal court. The right to a jury trial in civil cases does not extend to the states, except when a state court is enforcing a federally created right, of which the right to trial by jury is a substantial part.

The court determines the right to jury based on all claims by all parties involved. If the plaintiff brings only equitable claims but the defendant asserts counterclaims of law, the court grants a jury trial. In accordance with Beacon Theaters, the jury first determines the facts, then the judge enter judgment on the equitable claims.

Following the historical English tradition, U.S. juries have usually been composed of 12 jurors, and the jury's verdict has usually been required to be unanimous. However, in many jurisdictions, the number of jurors in civil cases is often reduced to a lesser number (such as five or six) by legislative enactment, or by agreement of both sides. Some jurisdictions also permit a verdict to be returned despite the dissent of some civil jurors.

==== Waiver of jury trial ====
The vast majority of U.S. criminal cases are not concluded with a jury verdict, but rather by plea bargain. Both prosecutors and defendants often have a strong interest in resolving the criminal case by negotiation resulting in a plea bargain. If the defendant waives a jury trial, a bench trial is held.

For civil cases, a jury trial must be demanded within a certain period of time per Federal Rules of Civil Procedure 38.

In United States Federal courts, there is no absolute right to waive a jury trial. Per Federal Rules of Criminal Procedure 23(a), only if the prosecution and the court consent may a defendant waive a jury trial for criminal cases. However, most states give the defendant the absolute right to waive a jury trial, and it has become commonplace to find such a waiver in routine contracts as a 2004 Wall Street Journal article states:

For years, in an effort to avoid the slow-moving wheels of the U.S. judicial system, many American companies have forced their customers and employees to agree to settle disputes outside of the courts, through private arbitration ... but the rising cost of arbitration proceedings has led some companies to decide they might be better off in the court system after all [so long as] they don't have to tangle with juries. The new tactic [is to] let disputes go to court, but on the condition that they be heard only by a judge.

The article goes on to claim:

The list includes residential leases, checking-account agreements, auto loans and mortgage contracts. Companies that believe juries are biased toward plaintiffs hope this approach will boost their chances of winning in court. Critics say that unfairly denies citizens' access to the full range of legal options guaranteed by the Constitution.

In the years since this 2004 article, this practice has become pervasive in the US and, especially in online agreements, it has become commonplace to include such waivers to trial by jury in everything from user agreements attached to software downloads to merely browsing a website. This practice, however, means that while such waivers may have legal force in one jurisdiction—in this case the United States—in the jurisdiction where a verdict is sought in the absence of jury trial (or indeed the presence of a defendant, or any legal representation in absentia) may well run directly counter to law in the jurisdiction—such as the United Kingdom—where the defendant resides, thus:

The judgment on R v Jones [2002] UKHL 5 issued by the United Kingdom's House of Lords states (in part, in Item 55) "the issue has to be determined by looking at the way in which the courts handled the problem under English criminal procedure and by deciding whether, in the result, the appellant can be said to have had a fair hearing."

==== Jury trials: terminating parental rights ====
Only five of the 50 states require or permit jury trials for cases where the state is seeking to legally sever a parent-child relationship. Oklahoma, Texas, Virginia, Wisconsin, and Wyoming. In Virginia, the jury is called an "advisory jury". The remaining 46 jurisdictions have case law or statutes or local court rules or common practice that specifically prohibits a jury trial in termination of parental rights cases. The fate of a family is exclusively placed in the hands of a single judge when there is no jury trial.

== Sources ==
- Casper, Gerhard; Zeisel, Hans [in German] (January 1972). "Lay Judges in the German Criminal Courts". Journal of Legal Studies. 1 (1): 135–191. doi:10.1086/467481. JSTOR 724014. S2CID 144941508.
- Jehle, Jörg-Martin; German Federal Ministry of Justice (2009). Criminal Justice in Germany. Forum-Verl. ISBN 978-3-936999-51-8.
- Delmas-Marty, Mireille (2002). European Criminal Procedures. Cambridge University Press. ISBN 978-0-521-59110-2.
- Bell, John (2006). Judiciaries Within Europe: A Comparative Review. Cambridge University Press. ISBN 978-0-521-86072-7.
- Wolfe, Nancy Travis (December 1994). "Lay Judges in German Criminal Courts: The Modification of an Institution". Proc. Am. Philos. Soc. 138 (4): 495–515. JSTOR 986849.
- Malsch, Marijke (2009). Democracy in the Courts: Lay Participation in European Criminal Justice Systems. Ashgate Publishing. ISBN 978-0-7546-7405-4.
- Vogler, Richard (2005). A World View of Criminal Justice. International and Comparative Criminal Justice. Ashgate Publishing. ISBN 978-0-7546-2467-7.
- Kahn-Freund, Otto (January 1974). "On Uses and Misuses of Comparative Law". Modern Law Review. 37 (1): 1–27. doi:10.1111/j.1468-2230.1974.tb02366.x. JSTOR 1094713.
- Wolff, Hans Julius [in German] (June 1944). "Criminal Justice in Germany". Michigan Law Review. 42 (6). footnote 7, pp. 1069–1070. doi:10.2307/1283584. JSTOR 1283584. Archived from the original on 2026-01-16.
- Bauer, Franz J. (23 December 2009). "Volksgerichte, 1918-1924". Historisches Lexikon Bayerns. Archived from the original on 24 September 2015.
- Der Hitler-Prozeß vor dem Volksgericht in München [The Hitler Trial Before the People's Court in Munich]. 1924.
- Fulda, Bernhard (2009). Press and politics in the Weimar Republic. Oxford University Press. ISBN 978-0-19-954778-4.
- Mulligan, William (2005). The Creation of the Modern German Army: General Walther Reinhardt and the Weimar Republic, 1914-1930. Monographs in German History. Vol. 12. Berghahn Books. ISBN 978-1-57181-908-6.
- Shirer, William L. (1990). The Rise and Fall of the Third Reich: A History of Nazi Germany. Simon and Schuster. ISBN 978-0-671-72868-7.
- Case, Nelson (1902). European Constitutional History. Jennings & Pye. p. 139. OCLC 608806061.
- Forsyth, William (1852). History of Trial by Jury. J. W. Parker. p. 369. OCLC 29739821.
- Terrill, Richard J. (2009). World Criminal Justice Systems: A Survey (7 ed.). Elsevier. ISBN 978-1-59345-612-2.
