= Protection of Lawful Commerce in Arms Act =

2005 U.S. law limiting criminal liability

- Other short titles: Child Safety Lock Act of 2005
- Long title: An Act to prohibit civil liability actions from being brought or continued against manufacturers, distributors, dealers, or importers of firearms or ammunition for damages, injunctive or other relief resulting from the misuse of their products by others.
- Acronyms (colloquial): PLCAA
- Nicknames: Protection of Lawful Commerce in Arms Act of 2005
- Enacted by: the 109th United States Congress
- Effective: October 26, 2005

Citations
- Public law: 109-92
- Statutes at Large: 119 Stat. 2095

Codification
- Titles amended: 15 U.S.C.: Commerce and Trade; 18 U.S.C.: Crimes and Criminal Procedure
- U.S.C. sections created: 15 U.S.C. ch. 105 §§ 7901, 7902, 7903
- U.S.C. sections amended: 18 U.S.C. ch. 44 §§ 921, 922, 924

Legislative history
- Introduced in the Senate as S. 397 by Larry Craig (R–ID) on February 16, 2005; Passed the Senate on July 29, 2005 (65-31 Roll call vote 219, via Senate.gov); Passed the House on October 20, 2005 (283-144 Roll call vote 534, via Clerk.House.gov); Signed into law by President George W. Bush on October 26, 2005

United States Supreme Court cases
- Smith & Wesson Brands, Inc. v. Mexico, No. 23-1141, 604 U.S. ___ (2025)

The Protection of Lawful Commerce in Arms Act (PLCAA) is a U.S. law, passed in 2005, that protects firearms manufacturers and dealers from being held liable when crimes have been committed with their products. Both arms manufacturers and dealers can still be held liable for damages resulting from defective products, breach of contract, criminal misconduct, and other actions for which they are directly responsible. They also may be held liable for negligent entrustment if it is found that they had reason to believe that a firearm was intended for use in a crime.

== Background ==
In the years before passage of the act, victims of firearms violence in the United States had successfully sued manufacturers and dealers for negligence on the grounds that they should have foreseen that their products would be diverted to criminal use.

In 1998, Chicago Mayor Richard M. Daley sued gun makers and dealers, saying: "You can't expect the status quo on businesses which make money and then have no responsibility to us as citizens." The city of Bridgeport, Connecticut, also sued several gun companies. Mayor Joseph Ganim said that the city's action aimed at "creating law with litigation.... That's the route that we're going because [the industry has] always very effectively, with big money, lobbied the legislature and kept laws from being passed."

In 2000, Smith & Wesson, facing several state and federal lawsuits, signed an agreement brokered by President Bill Clinton, in which the company voluntarily agreed to implementing various measures in order to settle the suits. The agreement required Smith & Wesson to sell guns only through dealers that complied with the restrictions on all guns sold regardless of manufacturer, thus potentially having a much wider potential impact than just Smith & Wesson.

US Secretary of Housing and Urban Development Andrew Cuomo was quoted as saying that gun manufacturers that did not comply would suffer "death by a thousand cuts", and then-New York Attorney General Eliot Spitzer said that those who didn't cooperate would have bankruptcy lawyers "knocking at your door".

In January 2005, New York City passed a law allowing lawsuits against gun manufacturers and dealers that did not voluntarily implement certain gun control measures.

As of 2020, at least six courts at the federal, state and appellate levels had upheld the law's constitutionality, although an appeals court in Pennsylvania found it in violation in 2020. Remington Arms' four insurance companies paid a $73 million settlement with Sandy Hook plaintiffs in 2021 regarding its alleged violations of state law (specifically Connecticut's Unfair Trade Practices Act). Although PLCAA protections had been raised by the manufacturer in Sandy Hook negotiations prior to the settlement, a similar but entirely separate case had been declined by the U.S. Supreme Court in 2019 (Remington Arms Co. v. Soto).

== Legislative history ==
The act was introduced in the midst of a large number of lawsuits filed by anti-gun advocates and city governments claiming that gun manufacturers were creating a "public nuisance" by selling guns.

The act was passed by the U.S. Senate on July 29, 2005, by a vote of 65–31. On October 20, 2005, it was passed by the House of Representatives with 283 in favor and 144 opposed.

It was signed into law on October 26, 2005, by President George W. Bush and became Public Law 109–92. Wayne LaPierre of the National Rifle Association thanked President Bush for signing the Act, for which it had lobbied, describing it as "... the most significant piece of pro-gun legislation in twenty years into law".

== Lawsuits ==
As of October 2020, seven lawsuits have challenged the constitutionality of the law under the 5th and 10th Amendments, and resulted in both state and federal appellate court decisions; all of these have found the PLCAA constitutional, except for Gustafson v. Springfield Armory and National Shooting Sports Foundation Inc. v. James (see below).

=== Constitutionality ===
Gustafson v. Springfield Armory
- Court: Superior Court of Pennsylvania
- Full case name: Mark and Leah Gustafson, Individually and as Administrators and Personal Representatives of the Estate of James Robert ("J.R.") Gustafson, Appellants, v. Springfield Inc., d/b/a Springfield Armory and Saloom Department Store and Saloom Dept. Store LLC d/b/a Saloom Department Store, Appellees; The United States of America, Intervenor
- Decided: September 28, 2020
- Citation: 2020 PA Superior Court 239

Case history
- Appealed from: Westmoreland County Court of Common Pleas
- Appealed to: Superior Court en banc

Court membership
- Judges sitting: John T. Bender, Deborah Kunselman, John Musmanno

Case opinions
- Federal Protection of Lawful Commerce in Arms Act is unconstitutional since it usurps state power over tort law in violation of Tenth Amendment and application to suit by appellants is beyond scope of Commerce Clause as they did not own the handgun involved in their son's accidental death.
- Decision by: Kunselman

Keywords
- Federalism; negligence; gun control

Several suits have challenged the constitutionality of the PLCAA. Ileto and District of Columbia v. Beretta U.S.A. unsuccessfully sought to have it ruled in violation of the separation of powers and the Due Process Clause of the Fifth Amendment, by usurping the functions of the judicial branch. Another suit against Beretta and other gun manufacturers, brought by New York City, argued that the activities regulated by the law were beyond Congress's authority to regulate interstate commerce and violated the Tenth Amendment by usurping power properly reserved to the states. (Note: Dissenting judge Robert Katzmann argued that the court could and should have avoided the constitutional claims, and merely certified the city's state-law claim to the New York Court of Appeals, the state's highest court.)

==== Gustafson v. Springfield Armory ====
In 2020's Gustafson v. Springfield Armory, a three-judge panel of the Superior Court of Pennsylvania reversed a lower court in holding the PLCAA an unconstitutional violation of the Tenth Amendment and the Commerce Clause, the first time a court had so held. The plaintiffs were parents of a teenage boy killed when a friend pointed a handgun at him and fired, believing erroneously that since there was no magazine in the gun at the time, it would not fire. They argued it was negligent of Springfield, the manufacturer, to not have included this feature, common to other handguns and dating back at least a century. The federal government joined the case as an intervenor to defend the constitutionality of the PLCAA.

Judge Deborah Kunselman initially dismissed most of the plaintiffs' arguments, finding their action met the definition of "qualified civil liability" that the law required state and federal courts to immediately dismiss. She did not find in the legislative history of the PLCAA an indication that Congress did not intend to bar suits such as the Gustafsons, and that it explicitly required that in cases such as theirs, the shooter's conviction for involuntary manslaughter, a volitional criminal act, be considered the sole cause of the injury, their allegations of product defect notwithstanding. She also declined to invoke constitutional avoidance and read the statute narrowly to exclude the instant case, as she believed the PLCAA raised constitutional questions as "federal overreach arises (and will continue to arise) in every PLCAA case."

Kunselman was thus more receptive to the Gustafsons' attack on the PLCAA's constitutionality, that "Congress usurped the States' police powers embodied in the common law and the allocation of lawmaking authority between the branches of state government" in passing it, since she read the PLCAA to effectively bar any tort claim not also associated with a statutory claim, an argument she chastised the defendants for failing to answer, instead relying purely on the Supremacy Clause. The trial court had concluded that the statute was a legitimate regulation of interstate commerce on the basis of its title; Kunselman rejected this as facile, "excessive deference grant[ing] Congress license to interpret the Constitution." She rejected the Second Circuit's finding in New York City's lawsuit that the PLCAA was within Congress's authority simply because the firearms industry was unquestionably interstate commerce.

"Whether a law regulates an industry engaged in interstate or foreign commerce is not one of the three categories of Congressional authority under the Commerce Clause", Kunselman wrote. "Whether a law regulates private activity that substantially affects interstate commerce is"; in the instant case she found that the Gustafsons had not participated in interstate commerce since they did not own the gun. Kumselman cited two Supreme Court decisions to this effect: United States v. Lopez, which had invalidated a conviction under the federal Gun-Free School Zones Act of 1990, finding that law went beyond the bounds of regulating interstate commerce, and National Federation of Independent Business v. Sebelius, where a majority of the justices agreed, in separate opinions, that the individual mandate to buy health insurance under the Patient Protection and Affordable Care Act was unconstitutional because it compelled participation in interstate commerce.

The Superior Court announced it would review the decision en banc.

==== National Shooting Sports Foundation Inc. v. James ====
In July 2021, New York passed a law, Gen Bus L § 898-B (2021), which allowed the state to sue firearm manufacturers and suppliers if, by their business activities, they created or contributed to a health or safety threat to the public. This was predicated on the argument that the PLCAA was an overreach by US Congress which infringed on states' rights. Commentary was mixed as passage of the law could be "fairly characterized as an attempt to subvert the will of Congress", though the PLCAA's wording was clear that it made exceptions for lawsuits in which the manufacturer or seller knowingly violated State or Federal laws, which would include this new public nuisance law. Glock, Smith & Wesson, and other manufacturers brought a lawsuit in federal court against NY Attorney General Letitia James, challenging the law's legality. In the case, National Shooting Sports Foundation Inc. v. James, the manufacturers argued that the law was preempted by the PLCAA, violated the dormant Commerce Clause, and was vague. On May 25, 2022, Judge Mae D'Agostino ruled in favor of James and dismissed the lawsuit. The ruling upheld the law allowing such lawsuits since "Congress clearly intended to allow state statutes which regulate the firearms industry" which would include taking action against improper sales or marketing.

=== Related lawsuits ===
Since the law's passage, there have been two cases taken to a jury trial for damages. In the first, a jury found in favor of a gun store in Alaska after a gun purchased by Jason Coday was used in a murder. The second resulted in a six million dollar verdict against Badger Guns after guns negligently sold there were used to shoot police officers.

In 2010, the Supreme Court declined to hear an appeal in Ileto v. Glock, ending a lawsuit against Glock by the family of victims in the Los Angeles Jewish Community Center shooting.

The Brady Center and families of victims of the 2012 Aurora, Colorado shooting sued Lucky Gunner, the online store where some of the ammunition was purchased. Federal judge Richard Paul Matsch dismissed the charges. He ordered the plaintiffs to pay Lucky Gunner's legal fees under a separate Colorado law, HB 000–208.

In 2016, a Missouri gun store settled for $2.2 million, for selling a gun to a schizophrenic woman who later killed her father, after the Missouri Supreme Court ruled that the claim that the sale was "negligent entrustment" was not precluded by the PLCAA. The store had previously been warned by the woman's mother that she was mentally unstable, and asked that they not sell her a gun. At trial the owner testified that he had instructed his employees to always sell to anyone who passed the federal background check; medical experts testified that it would have been obvious to the employee who sold the woman the gun that she was mentally ill as he had noted that she seemed "nervous and in a hurry" at that time.

In October 2016, a Connecticut Superior Court judge dismissed a lawsuit filed by the families of some victims of the 2012 Sandy Hook Elementary School shooting against the manufacturer (Remington), the wholesale distributor, and the retailer of the semi-automatic rifle used in the shooting. Judge Barbara Bellis ruled that the suit "falls squarely within the broad immunity" provided to gun manufacturers and dealers by the Protection of Lawful Commerce in Arms Act. The case was subsequently moved to federal court before being referred back to Connecticut state court. In March 2019, the Connecticut Supreme Court reversed the lower court's ruling, allowing plaintiffs to continue their suit against Remington as it ruled that the federal government did not intend to protect firearms companies from "truly unethical and irresponsible marketing practices promoting criminal conduct" which is addressed by the Connecticut Unfair Trade Practices Act (CUTPA). The US Supreme Court declined to intervene in ongoing litigation that had not been decided. In March 2022, the families of nine victims of the shooting announced they had reached a US$73 million settlement with the now defunct Remington. As part of that settlement, Remington allowed their release of internal documents concerning their marketing, though it has not been stated when this release will occur.

A lawsuit by victims of the Sutherland Springs shooting against the gun shop that sold the gun has been allowed to proceed because the shooter used a Colorado driver's license as identification to purchase the gun, which has a 30-round magazine as standard. In sales of firearms to the resident of another state, the sale must comply with the laws of both the seller's and the purchaser's states. Colorado law prohibits the sale of magazines capable of holding more than 15 rounds.

== Other industries with liability exemptions ==
Vaccine manufacturers are exempted from civil liability related to adverse vaccine-caused events by the National Childhood Vaccine Injury Act. Internet service providers are exempted from defamation suits by Section 230. Airline companies were exempted from liability suits connected to the September 11 attacks.

== Renewed interest ==
After the 2012 Aurora, Colorado, and Sandy Hook, Connecticut, shooting incidents, a renewed effort has been mounted to repeal the Protection of Lawful Commerce in Arms Act to make it possible for victims of gun violence to sue firearms manufacturers and dealers on a broader array of grounds.

=== 2016 election ===
During the 2016 United States presidential election, the act became a campaign issue, particularly within the Democratic Party primaries.

Hillary Clinton stated that she would repeal the law if elected, saying: "They are the only business in America that is wholly protected from any kind of liability. They can sell a gun to someone they know they shouldn't, and they won't be sued. There will be no consequences." Shortly after Clinton made this claim, fact checker Politifact rated the statement false, noting that other businesses and entities in America have similar or greater levels of protection against liability, and that firearms dealers and manufacturers are still susceptible to lawsuits and liability.

Bernie Sanders, who as a congressman voted for the law in 2005, defended the law in October 2015, saying: "If somebody has a gun and it falls into the hands of a murderer and the murderer kills somebody with a gun, do you hold the gun manufacturer responsible? Not any more than you would hold a hammer company responsible if somebody beats somebody over the head with a hammer." He changed his position somewhat in January 2016, saying that he would favor a partial repeal of the law.

=== 2020 election ===
In 2020, Bernie Sanders was again criticized for voting in favor of the law, especially by Joe Biden.

== Criticism ==
The progressive think tank Center for American Progress contends that the PLCAA prevents "victims of gun violence from pursuing well-established legal claims against irresponsible gun manufacturers and sellers—without presenting an alternative means for the victims to be compensated."

Exceptions within the law that allow lawsuits to go forward fall under "negligent entrustment" and "predicate exception" actions, which target negligent retailers or manufacturers who violated local statutes applicable to the sale of firearms, but these cases are difficult to prove and rarely clear the PLCAA threshold in court.

A 2007 report in the American Journal of Public Health states that the PLCAA is potentially dangerous to the public health because it removes both regulation and litigation as incentives for firearm companies to make their products safer.

This viewpoint has been criticized by certain circles, including scholars at the libertarian think tank Cato Institute, which noted that the "PLCAA's purpose was to curb efforts by gun‐control advocates to circumvent state legislatures and attack Second Amendment rights through a never‐ending series of lawsuits against manufacturers and retailers of firearms to hold them financially responsible for crimes committed using the weapons they make and sell."

However, there is disagreement among lower Federal courts about whether or not the Second Amendment extends to firearm manufacturers and sellers. According to the Harvard Law Review,

The leading exponent of this theory was the Fourth Circuit panel in United States v. Chafin, which stated there is nothing "that remotely suggests that, at the time of its ratification, the Second Amendment was understood to protect an individual's right to sell a firearm." The Chafin holding is not binding precedent, since the decision was unpublished. Nevertheless, a federal district court in West Virginia adopted and followed Chafin's rule. Likewise, in Montana Shooting Sports Association v. Holder, a federal district court stated (albeit in dicta), "Heller said nothing about extending Second Amendment protection to firearm manufacturers or dealers. If anything, Heller recognized that firearms manufacturers and dealers are properly subject to regulation . . . ."

Additionally, in October 2020 a subpoena was issued by New Jersey Attorney General Gurbir Grewal to seek evidence of fraudulent advertising by Smith & Wesson, thereby falling under violation of consumer protection and public safety laws. A lawsuit filed against the New Jersey AG office by Smith & Wesson was summarily rejected by the Federal Judge, saying that the gun manufacturer's constitutional rights were not at all violated. According to Professor Timothy Lytton of Georgia State University College of Law, "We've seen that this kind of phenomenon of trying to regulate industry through litigation occurs, both through private efforts of individual plaintiffs victims who bring civil lawsuits on their own behalf, and once those lawsuits generally get off the ground, we often see public officials come into the picture."

== See also ==
- Gun control
- Gun law in the United States
- Gun politics in the United States
