= Fraud (Trials Without a Jury) Bill =

The Fraud (Trials Without a Jury) Bill 2007 was a proposed act of Parliament introduced Home Secretary John Reid.

== Provisions ==
Its intention was to abolish trials by jury in complex fraud cases in England, Wales and Northern Ireland by amending section 43 of the Criminal Justice Act 2003. The government said that it would only apply to approximately 6 cases per year.

== Legislative passage ==
The bill was given its first reading in the House of Commons on 16 November 2006. In a highly unusual move it was blocked by the House of Lords using a delaying tactic voted on 20 March 2007.

Fraud (Trials Without a Jury) Bill – Kingsland Motion to delay Second Reading for 6 months
Party	Votes for (opposes bill)	Votes against (supports bill)
Labour	2: Mallalieu, B.; Rowlands, L.	
Conservatives		
Liberal Democrats		1: Taverne, L.
Crossbenchers		11: Birt, L.; Chorley, L.; Crisp, L.; Finlay of Llandaff, B.; Howarth of Breckland, B.; Hylton, L.; Joffe, L.; Low of Dalston, L.; Monson, L.; Patel, L.; Sandwich, E.
Bishops	2: York, Abp.; Southwell and Nottingham, Bp.	-
Green Party	1: Beaumont of Whitley, L.	-
UKIP	1: Pearson of Rannoch, L.	-
Conservative Independent	1: Stevens of Ludgate, L.	-
Independent Labour	1: Stoddart of Swindon, L	-

== House of Lords ==
Then Conservative Shadow Lord Chancellor Lord Kingsland said:

On the substance of the matter, as your Lordships are well aware, jury trial has been a central component in the conduct of all serious criminal trials for about the past 700 years. Its contribution to the preservation of the liberty of the individual, and to the legitimacy of Government, is quite incalculable.

— Christopher Prout, Lord Kingsland
