= Jason Coday =

American murderer (born 1978)

Jason Michael Coday (born February 7, 1978) is a man from Vernal, Utah. On May 15, 2007, he was convicted of first-degree murder in the death of Simone Yung Kim behind the Fred Meyer store in Juneau, Alaska on August 4, 2006. It was the city's first murder in five years.

== History ==
Coday was a drifter doing odd jobs. The week before Kim's death, he had worked in Ketchikan, Alaska at a fish processing plant; he had planned to do similar work in Juneau.

I never really had one [job] to stick with.

— Jason Coday, during a police interrogation

Two months prior to Kim's death, he had been accused of a similar gun crime in Nevada, when he allegedly harassed the Top family in Sandy Valley. Upon being arrested, he was found with methamphetamine (which he admitted to having used when questioned by police) and marijuana in addition to a sawed-off shotgun and ammunition. He is a registered felon in that state. Coday skipped bail and a warrant for his arrest was issued in July 2006.

Coday came to Juneau on August 2, 2006 aboard the Alaska Marine Highway System ferry M/V Matanuska. That same day, he is believed to have illegally taken a gun from Rayco Sales, a Juneau gun store located across Egan Drive from Fred Meyer, leaving $200 on the counter. He also bought ammunition at the Fred Meyer store using cash. The murder of Simone Yung Kim, a painting contractor from Anchorage who was involved in construction work occurring at the store, was apparently a random act of violence. Coday allegedly shot Kim in the face and continued to shoot the victim using two more rounds of ammunition. Juneau resident Ed Buyarski attempted to take the gun from Coday but the latter escaped into the woods behind the store. Buyarski, whose training in hunting had included muzzle control, notified the police. On July 19, he was awarded a commendation from the Alaska Peace Officers Association for his actions.

== Trial details ==
Coday's bail had been set at $1 million. The trial, State of Alaska v. Coday, began on Monday, May 7, 2007. The defense attempted to have Coday's arrest and the gathering of evidence in the case deemed illegal, due to inconsistencies in witnesses' description of the suspect at the time of the arrest, but Juneau-based Alaska Superior Court Judge Michael Thompson decided against the motion.

Jury selection began on May 8 and concluded the following day. Testimony lasted from May 10 and ended on May 15, when the jury began deliberation. The prosecution used the testimony of two Fred Meyer workers who witnessed the killing. In addition, the owner of Rayco Sales, Ray Coxe, testified that Coday had illegally taken a Ruger 10/22 .22-caliber rifle from the store and left two $100 bills on the counter. The rifle was identified as the murder weapon. DNA evidence pointed to Coday as the killer with the odds of an error being about 1 in 49 billion. Tracks from Coday's shoes at the crime scene were another factor.

Upon the reading of the verdict, Coday head-butted his own attorney, public defender David Seid, and was taken out of the courtroom. Coday received 99 years in prison for Kim's death, and an additional two years for weapons misconduct, for sawing off the end of the murder weapon. He will be eligible for parole in 2046. The Juneau Empire reported on July 31, 2008 that Kim's family filed a wrongful death lawsuit against both Coday and Coxe. Court documents filed in the suit allege that Coxe should have known better than to leave Coday alone in the store with the firearm he wound up stealing.

== See also ==
- Protection of Lawful Commerce in Arms Act
