= Brew City Shooters Supply =

Gun shop in West Milwaukee, Wisconsin

- Formerly: Badger Guns or Badger Outdoors
- Industry: Firearms
- Founded: January 2012; 14 years ago in West Milwaukee, Wisconsin, United States
- Website: brewcityshooterssupply.com

Brew City Shooter Supply, previously known as Badger Guns and Badger Outdoors is a gun shop in West Milwaukee, Wisconsin, just outside Milwaukee. The business has been investigated for alleged "straw purchase" sales of firearms and ammunition that brought it attention from the media and the U.S. BATF. In 2015, the firm was ordered to pay nearly $6 million to two police officers for having illegally sold a gun.

== Controversy ==
=== Straw purchase ===
The shop has been involved with several controversies regarding the straw purchase of guns and the number of guns sold by the shop that have been used in crimes. The shop has had its license to sell firearms revoked. To stay open legal ownership of shop has changed hands several times within the relatives and friends of the original owner.

In 2010, the Brady Center named the store the #1 seller of crime guns in the nation, based on an ATF statement.

=== Law enforcement lawsuit ===
Allegedly related, but separate from the straw purchase incidents, lawsuits have been filled by several members of the Milwaukee law enforcement community against Badger Guns because firearms purchased from the store were used to shoot officers in the course of their duties. On October 14, 2015, the store was ordered to pay almost $6 million to two police officers who were shot in the line of duty in 2009. The lawsuit is the second case of its type since the passage of the Protection of Lawful Commerce in Arms Act, and the only case to result in any damages. The law generally protects firearms manufacturers and dealers from being held liable when crimes have been committed with their products. However, both manufacturers and dealers can still be held liable for negligence when they have reason to know a gun is intended for use in a crime.

== Business operations ==
In 2011 the shop ceased to sell guns, but continued to sell ammunition and gun accessories. The shop continued to operate a shooting range.

In 2012 Mike Allan, a former employee of Badger Guns and the brother of original owner Adam Allan, obtained federal firearms licenses and changed the business name to Brew City Shooter Supply. The store now only sells to members who have taken a class, have a concealed carry permit, and/or demonstrate firearms competency along with paying an annual fee. The current owner announced that the intention of these requirements is to prevent straw purchases that caused problems previously.

== See also ==
- Gun politics in the United States
- Gun laws in Wisconsin
