= Habit evidence =

Habit evidence is a term used in the law of evidence in the United States to describe any evidence submitted for the purpose of proving that a person acted in a particular way on a particular occasion based on that person's tendency to reflexively respond to a particular situation in a particular way.

Habit evidence must be distinguished from character evidence, which seeks to show that a person behaved in a particular way on a particular occasion based on that person's prior bad acts, or based on the opinion of a witness, or based on that person's reputation in the community. Such character evidence is generally inadmissible.

Federal Rule of Evidence 406 states, "Evidence of the habit of a person or of the routine practice of an organization, whether corroborated or not and regardless of the presence of an eyewitness, is relevant to prove that the conduct of the person or organization on a particular occasion was in conformity with the habit or routine practice".

For example, suppose there was a bar called "Study Hall" located near a college campus. "Happy Hour Joe" is the nickname of a regular patron of this bar, and he frequents the bar every day, Monday through Friday, at approximately 5:30 p.m. on his way home from work. Joe typically has 1 or 2 beers, and then leaves. A party could introduce this evidence of habit if the party wanted to show it was more probable that Joe was at Study Hall on Wednesday at 5:30 p.m. A party could also introduce the evidence if the party wanted to show it was more probable that, on his way home Wednesday at 6 p.m., Joe had been drinking.

However, the evidence could not be introduced to show that Happy Hour Joe is an alcoholic, or that he is a careless driver. That would be character evidence.

== Sources ==
- Federal Rules of Evidence
- Online Federal Evidence Review
