= Clive Grossman =

Hong Kong criminal defence barrister

Clive S Grossman, Senior Counsel (born 7 July 1940, London) is a leading Hong Kong criminal defence barrister. He lived in Zimbabwe from 1947 to 1983, and was a member of the Zimbabwe Bar from 1967 to 1983. He moved to Hong Kong and became the Deputy Crown Prosecutor in 1993. He then went into private practice at the Hong Kong Bar. General Editor of the leading criminal practitioner's guide, Archbold Hong Kong and other leading legal publications, he has also served as the Vice Chairperson of the Hong Kong Bar.
