= Criminal Justice Act 2003 =

Act of the Parliament of the United Kingdom

Criminal Justice Act 2003 (Note: Section 339.)
- Act of Parliament
- Parliament of the United Kingdom
- Long title: An Act to make provision about criminal justice (including the powers and duties of the police) and about dealing with offenders; to amend the law relating to jury service; to amend Chapter 1 of Part 1 of the Crime and Disorder Act 1998 and Part 5 of the Police Act 1997; to make provision about civil proceedings brought by offenders; and for connected purposes.
- Citation: 2003 c. 44
- Territorial extent: England and Wales (entire act); Scotland; Northern Ireland (parts); Channel Islands; Isle of Man (by Order in Council); (Note: Section 337.)

Dates
- Royal assent: 20 November 2003
- Commencement: Various (Note: Section 336.)
Other legislation
Amends	Licensing Act 1872; Explosive Substances Act 1883; Indictments Act 1915; Aliens Restriction (Amendment) Act 1919; Administration of Justice (Miscellaneous Provisions) Act 1933; Cinematograph Films (Animals) Act 1937; Agricultural Marketing Act 1958; Plant Health Act 1967; Criminal Law Act 1967; Criminal Appeal Act 1968; Courts-Martial (Appeals) Act 1968; Theft Act 1968; Courts Act 1971; Misuse of Drugs Act 1971; Immigration Act 1971; Criminal Justice Act 1972; Juries Act 1974; Bail Act 1976; Criminal Law Act 1977; Judicature (Northern Ireland) Act 1978; Customs and Excise Management Act 1979; Magistrates' Courts Act 1980; Criminal Appeal (Northern Ireland) Act 1980; Law Reform (Miscellaneous Provisions) (Scotland) Act 1980; Public Passenger Vehicles Act 1981; Fisheries Act 1981; Forgery and Counterfeiting Act 1981; Criminal Attempts Act 1981; Senior Courts Act 1981; Criminal Justice Act 1988; Firearms (Amendment) Act 1988; Town and Country Planning Act 1990; Courts and Legal Services Act 1990; Deer Act 1991; Water Industry Act 1991; Water Resources Act 1991; Social Security Administration Act 1992; Value Added Tax Act 1994; Goods Vehicles (Licensing of Operators) Act 1995; Criminal Procedure (Scotland) Act 1995; Police Act 1996; Education Act 1996; Police Act 1997; Crime and Disorder Act 1998; Scotland Act 1998; Government of Wales Act 1998; Youth Justice and Criminal Evidence Act 1999; Terrorism Act 2000; Countryside and Rights of Way Act 2000; International Criminal Court Act 2001; Anti-terrorism, Crime and Security Act 2001; Crime (International Co-operation) Act 2003
Amended by	Domestic Violence, Crime and Victims Act 2004; Drugs Act 2005; Terrorism Act 2006; Wireless Telegraphy Act 2006; Government of Wales Act 2006; Violent Crime Reduction Act 2006; National Health Service (Consequential Provisions) Act 2006; Safeguarding Vulnerable Groups Act 2006; Criminal Justice and Immigration Act 2008; Statute Law (Repeals) Act 2008; Counter-Terrorism Act 2008; Domestic Violence, Crime and Victims (Amendment) Act 2012; Co-operative and Community Benefit Societies Act 2014; Criminal Justice and Courts Act 2015; Modern Slavery Act 2015; Policing and Crime Act 2017; Space Industry Act 2018; Voyeurism (Offences) Act 2019; Counter-Terrorism and Border Security Act 2019; Offensive Weapons Act 2019; Sentencing (Pre-consolidation Amendments) Act 2020; Sentencing Act 2020; Domestic Abuse Act 2021; Sentencing Act 2026; National Security (State Threats) Act 2026

Status: Partially repealed

Text of statute as originally enacted

Revised text of statute as amended

The Criminal Justice Act 2003 (c. 44) is an act of the Parliament of the United Kingdom. It is a wide-ranging measure introduced to modernise many areas of the criminal justice system in England and Wales and, to a lesser extent, in Scotland and Northern Ireland. Large portions of the act were repealed and replaced by the Sentencing Act 2020.

It amends the law relating to police powers, bail, disclosure, allocation of criminal offences, prosecution appeals, autrefois acquit ("double jeopardy"), hearsay, propensity evidence, bad character evidence, sentencing and release on licence. It permits offences to be tried by a judge sitting alone without a jury, in cases where there is a danger of jury-tampering. It also expands the circumstances in which defendants can be tried twice for the same offence (double jeopardy), when "new and compelling evidence" is introduced.

== Origins ==
The act had its genesis in several reports and consultations:

- Home Secretary David Blunkett, Lord Chancellor Irvine of Lairg and Attorney-General Lord Goldsmith's Justice for All - A White Paper on the Criminal Justice System, published 17 July 2002
- Lord Justice Auld's Review of the Criminal Courts of England and Wales, published on 5 September 2001
- Deputy Under Secretary of State John Halliday's Making Punishment Work: report of a review of the sentencing framework of England and Wales, published on 16 May 2000
- Mr Justice Carnwath's Law Commission report: Evidence of Bad Character of Criminal Proceedings, published on 9 October 2001
- Mrs Justice Arden's Law Commission report: Evidence in Criminal Proceedings: Hearsay and Related Topics, published on 19 June 1997
- Mr Justice Carnwath's Law Commission report: Double Jeopardy and Prosecution Appeals, published on 6 March 2001

Other recommendations of the Criminal Courts Review relating to court procedures were implemented in the Courts Act 2003.

The intention of the Act was to introduce reforms in two main areas: improved case management and a reduction in scope for abuse of the system.

== Reforms to court and police procedure ==
=== Stop and search powers ===
Police "stop and search" powers are increased to include cases of suspected criminal damage in, for example, the carrying of spray paint by aspirant graffiti artists. People who accompany constables on a search of premises may now take an active part in the search, as long as they remain accompanied at all times. This is particularly useful in cases where computer or financial evidence may need to be sifted at the scene, for which outside expertise is required.

=== Bail ===
The right of a prisoner to make an application to the High Court is abolished. Previously an application could be made to the Crown Court and the High Court as of right. The right to make a bail application by way of judicial review remains, although only if its more stringent tests applicable are satisfied. The Crown Court is now effectively the final arbiter of bail in criminal cases. Prosecution appeals against decisions of magistrates' courts to grant bail are extended to all imprisonable criminal offences.

=== Conditional cautions ===
The police may now, as well as issuing the normal cautions (which are unconditional), issue conditional cautions. The recipient of any kind of caution must admit his guilt of the offence for which the caution is imposed. Conditional cautions must be issued in accordance with a code of practice, issued by the Home Secretary. They will impose conditions upon the offender. If those conditions are breached the offender may then be prosecuted for the offence. The Criminal Justice and Immigration Act 2008 extends the adult conditional caution scheme to young offenders.

=== Disclosure ===
The act makes amendments to the Criminal Procedure and Investigations Act 1996 relating to prosecution and defence disclosure. The old system was that the prosecution would provide initial disclosure to the defence (known as "primary disclosure"), the defence would provide a "defence statement" and the prosecution would provide "secondary disclosure" in response to that defence statement. Now the prosecution are under a continuous duty to disclose evidence, though the defence statement would impose a revised and stricter (depending on the contents and detail of the defence statement) test. The test for disclosure — "evidence which undermines the prosecution case or assists the defence case" — remains, though the prosecutor's own opinion of whether unused evidence meets those criteria is replaced by an objective test. However, the defence still cannot force the prosecutor to disclose such evidence until a defence statement is produced, so this change means little in practice.

Reforms are made to the extent to which the defence must disclose their case in order to trigger both the revised duty to disclose and the right to a "section 8" application to the court to force the prosecution to disclose an item of evidence. A defence statement must now state each point at which issue is taken with the prosecution and why, any particular defence or points of law (such as evidential admissibility or abuse of process) upon which he or she would rely. The defendant must also give a list of defence witnesses, along with their names and addresses. The police may then interview those witnesses, according to a code of practice issued by the Home Secretary. The Explanatory Notes make it clear the police interviewing of potential defence witnesses is one of the intents of the Act. The details of any defence expert witness instructed must also be given to the prosecution, whether or not they are then used in the case. However, no part of the Act explicitly amends the law on legal privilege, so the contents of any correspondence or expert report would remain confidential to the same extent as before.

Co-defendants must now also disclose their defence statements to each other as well as to the prosecution. The duty to serve defence statements remains compulsory in the Crown Court and voluntary in magistrates' courts.

=== Allocation and sending of offences ===
The mode of trial provisions are amended to allow the court to be made aware of the defendant's previous convictions at the mode of trial stage (that is, when a magistrates' court decides whether certain offences are to be tried summarily before them or before a judge and jury at the Crown Court). The right to commit to the Crown Court for sentence (when a magistrates' court regards its own powers as insufficient) is abolished for cases when it has previously accepted jurisdiction. These provisions amend the previous position when a defendant whose bad prior record means that he is tried summarily and then sent elsewhere for sentence; the same type of court deals with both trial and sentence in ordinary cases. The provisions were introduced over section 41 and section 42 of Part 6 of the act.

=== Prosecution appeals against case termination and evidence exclusion ===
The prosecution are given, for the first time, the right to appeal decisions by judges in the Crown Court which either terminate the case or exclude evidence. The prosecution has historically had the right to appeal decisions in the magistrates' courts on grounds of error of law or unreasonableness, and the right under the Criminal Justice Act 1988 to appeal an "unduly lenient sentence".

A "terminating ruling" is one which stops the case, or in the prosecution's view, so damages the prosecution case that the effect would be the same. Adverse evidentiary rulings on prosecution evidence can be appealed for certain serious offences before the start of the defence case. These appeals are "interlocutory", in that they occur during the middle of the trial and stops the trial pending the outcome of the appeal. They differ in this respect from a defendant's appeal which can only be heard after conviction.

=== Jury service ===
The act expanded substantially the number of people eligible for jury service, firstly by removing the various former grounds of ineligibility, and secondly by reducing the scope for people to avoid service when called up. Only members of the Armed Forces whose commanding officers certify that their absence would be prejudicial to the efficiency of the Service can be excused jury duty.

This has been controversial, as people now eligible for jury service (who were previously ineligible) include judges, lawyers and police officers. Judge Bathurst-Norman commented: "I don't know how this legislation is going to work intelligently."

== Trials without a jury ==
The act introduced measures to permit trial without a jury in the specific cases of complex fraud (s.43) and jury tampering (s.44), though these provisions did not come into force on the passage of the Act.

=== Complex fraud ===
Section 43 of the Act sought to allow cases of serious or complex fraud to be tried without a jury if a judge was satisfied that:

the complexity of the trial or the length of the trial (or both) is likely to make the trial so burdensome to the members of a jury hearing the trial that the interests of justice require that serious consideration should be given to the question of whether the trial should be conducted without a jury.

However the Attorney General, Lord Goldsmith, subsequently sought to repeal the section and to replace it with new provisions under the Fraud (Trials Without a Jury) Bill. In the event, that Bill was defeated and plans to introduce trials without a jury in serious fraud cases were dropped. Section 43 of the Act was repealed on 1 May 2012 by section 113 of the Protection of Freedoms Act 2012.

=== Jury tampering ===
A case where a judge was satisfied that there was "evidence of a real and present danger that jury tampering would take place", and "notwithstanding any steps (including the provision of police protection) which might reasonably be taken to prevent jury tampering, the likelihood that it would take place would be so substantial as to make it necessary in the interests of justice for the trial to be conducted without a jury" may also be conducted without a jury. This provision came into force on 24 July 2007.

On 18 June 2009, the Court of Appeal in England and Wales made a landmark ruling under the terms of the Act that resulted in the Lord Chief Justice, Lord Judge, allowing the first-ever Crown Court trial to be held without a jury. The case in question involved four men accused of an armed robbery at Heathrow Airport in February 2004. It was the fourth time the case had been tried, but this time in front of only a single judge. The trial opened on 12 January 2010. The four accused were convicted, and on 31 March 2010 they received sentences ranging from 15 years to life. It was the first juryless criminal trial held in England for over 400 years.

== Retrial for serious offences (the "double jeopardy" rule) ==
The act creates an exception to the double jeopardy rule, by providing that an acquitted defendant may be tried a second time for a serious offence. In November 2000 both the Home Secretary Jack Straw and the Leader of the Opposition William Hague favoured this measure.

The prosecutor must have the permission of the Director of Public Prosecutions prior to making the application for a second trial. Authority to give permission may not be exercised generally by Crown Prosecutors (typically employed lawyers of the Crown Prosecution Service), but can be delegated. There is a requirement for "new and compelling evidence", not adduced during the original trial, to be found. A "public interest" test must also be satisfied, which includes an assessment of the prospect of a fair trial. The application is made to the Court of Appeal, which is the sole authority for quashing an acquittal and ordering a retrial. The offence to be re-tried must be among a list of offences in Schedule 5 of the Act, all of which involve maximum sentences of life imprisonment.

The Justice for All report of Blunkett, Lairg and Goldsmith prefaced the legislation with this statement on double jeopardy at paragraph 4.63:

The double jeopardy rule means that a person cannot be tried more than once for the same offence. It is an important safeguard to acquitted defendants, but there is an important general public interest in ensuring that those who have committed serious crimes are convicted of them. The Stephen Lawrence Inquiry Report recognised that the rule is capable of causing grave injustice to victims and the community in certain cases where compelling fresh evidence has come to light after an acquittal. It called for a change in the law to be considered, and we have accepted that such a change is appropriate. The European Convention on Human Rights (Article 4(2) of Protocol 7) explicitly recognises the importance of being able to re-open cases where new evidence comes to light.

The Justice for All report stated in paragraph 4.66 that the double jeopardy power was to be retrospective. That is, it was to apply to acquittals which took place before the law was changed, as well as those that happened afterwards.

This Act was not the first legislation to affect the double jeopardy rule: the Criminal Procedure and Investigations Act 1996 provided that an acquittal proved beyond reasonable doubt to have been procured through violence or intimidation of a juror or witness could be quashed by the High Court.

The first person to be re-tried under the Criminal Justice Act 2003 for an offence of which he had previously been acquitted was Billy Dunlop. He was acquitted of murdering his former girlfriend Julie Hogg in 1989. The application was brought by the Crown with the consent of the Director of Public Prosecutions, given in writing on 10 November 2005 and heard by the Lord Chief Justice of England and Wales on 16 June 2006, who granted it. Dunlop was retried and convicted on 6 October 2006. He was sentenced to a life term, with a minimum tariff of 17 years.

== Criminal evidence reform ==
=== Bad character ===
The 2003 Act extensively changed the law regarding the admissibility into evidence of a defendant's convictions for previous offences, and his other misconduct, broadening the circumstances in which the prosecution could introduce such matters. It also imposed statutory restrictions, for the first time, on the ability of defence lawyers to cross-examine prosecution witnesses about their own criminal records.

Bad character evidence is defined under section 98 as evidence of, or a disposition towards, misconduct on his part, other than evidence which -

(a) has to do with the alleged facts of the offence with which the defendant is charged, or

(b) is evidence of misconduct in connection with the investigation or prosecution of that offence.

Evidence of the defendant’s bad character includes not only previous convictions but also previous misconduct other than misconduct relating to the offence(s) charged. This fundamental change in the law means that under section 101(1) of the Criminal Justice Act 2003 the prosecution is free to adduce evidence of the defendant’s bad character subject to it passing through any one of seven gateways, unless it would have such an adverse effect on the fairness of the trial that it should not be admitted. Subsection 1 provides: in criminal proceedings evidence of the defendant’s bad character is admissible if, but only if—

1. all parties to the proceedings agree to the evidence being admissible,
2. the evidence is adduced by the defendant himself or is given in answer to a question asked by him in cross-examination and intended to elicit it,
3. it is important explanatory evidence,
4. it is relevant to an important matter in issue between the defendant and the prosecution,
5. it has substantial probative value in relation to an important matter in issue between the defendant and a co-defendant,
6. it is evidence to correct a false impression given by the defendant, or
7. the defendant has made an attack on another person’s character.

==== Exclusion of bad character evidence ====
The act provides for the exclusion of bad character evidence where it appears to the court that the admission of the evidence would have such an adverse effect on the fairness of the proceedings that the court ought not to admit it.

This language mirrors that of PACE 1984 s.78, with one minor difference - the Criminal Justice Act provides that courts 'must' exclude potentially unfair evidence, whilst PACE states courts 'may' exclude potentially unfair evidence.

=== Hearsay ===
The act made substantial reforms to the admissibility of hearsay evidence, building upon the reforms of the Criminal Justice Act 1988, which regulated use of business documents and absent witnesses. Various categories of the common law were preserved and the remainder abolished. A new power was incorporated to permit hearsay evidence if certain 'interests of justice' tests were met.

== Sentencing reform ==
Part 12 of the Criminal Justice Act made substantial amendments to nearly every part of sentencing practice, containing 159 sections and referring to 24 schedules. The regime set out in the Powers of Criminal Courts (Sentencing) Act 2000 was almost wholly replaced, even though it had only been passed three years previously and was itself coming slowly into force.

The act sets out in statute the principles underlying sentencing: punishment, crime reduction, reform and rehabilitation, public protection and reparation. These were previously part of the common law. The act also created the Sentencing Guidelines Council to give authoritative guidance.

The sentencing provisions of the Act are now contained in the Sentencing Act 2020.

=== Community sentences ===
The previous and varied types of community sentence (such as community punishment order, community rehabilitation order, drug treatment and testing order) have been replaced by a single "community order" with particular requirements, such as unpaid work, supervision, activity, curfew, exclusion, residence and others, alone or in combination with each other. The intent was to tailor sentences more closely to the offender.

=== Combined custody and community sentences ===
The previously deprecated "suspended sentence of imprisonment" returns, also allowing elements of a community order (see above) to be imposed at the same time. This ensures the offender knows what sentence of imprisonment is facing him or her if he or she fails to comply with the order or commits a further offence during its suspended period. Provision is made for sentences of intermittent custody, and custodial sentences followed by period of community work and supervision.

=== Dangerous offenders ===
The act replaced the previous law on the mandatory sentencing of defendants convicted of violent or sexual crimes, introducing compulsory life sentences or minimum sentences for over 150 offences (subject to the defendant meeting certain criteria). The act created a new kind of life sentence, called "imprisonment for public protection" (IPP), or "detention for public protection" for those aged under 18, which may even be imposed for offences which would otherwise carry a maximum sentence of ten years. In 2012, the European Court of Human Rights declared IPPs unlawful for new offenders, but not retrospectively.

In response to unprecedented prison overcrowding, Parliament passed sections 13 to 17 of the Criminal Justice and Immigration Act 2008 (with effect from 14 July 2008), which imposed stricter criteria for the imposition of these sentences, and restored judicial discretion by providing that they were no longer compulsory when the criteria were met.

=== Life sentences for murder ===
The House of Lords ruled in R v Secretary of State for the Home Department, ex parte Anderson [2001] EWCA Civ 1698 that the Home Secretary was not permitted to set minimum terms for life sentences. The reasoning was on the basis that in order to have a fair trial under Article 6 of the European Convention on Human Rights, a defendant should be sentenced by an independent tribunal (that is, a judge) and not a politician who will have extraneous and irrelevant concerns which may affect his or her judgment. The Home Secretary's (David Blunkett MP) response was outlined in a written response to a parliamentary question on 25 November 2002. Mr Blunkett said

The case of Anderson deals with the Home Secretary's power to set the tariff, or minimum period a convicted murderer must remain in custody until he becomes eligible for release. This power has ensured ministerial accountability to Parliament within the criminal justice system for the punishment imposed for the most heinous and serious of crimes. ... This judgment will affect only the issue of who sets the tariff in each case. As is proper in a democracy, Parliament will continue to retain the paramount role of setting a clear framework within which the minimum period to be served will be established. I am determined that there should continue to be accountability to Parliament for these most critical decisions. ... I intend to legislate this Session to establish a clear set of principles within which the courts will fix tariffs in the future. ... in setting a tariff, the judge will be required, in open court, to give reasons if the term being imposed departs from those principles.

The new law applies to murders committed on or after 18 December 2003. Schedule 21 of the Act sets out "minimum terms" (a term further defined in section 269(2)) for those convicted of murder. The terms are in the form of standard "starting points" based on age and other factors, from which any increase or decrease is then made by the sentencing judge according to the circumstances of the crime and the offender. "Aggravating and mitigating factors" are also set out, which can cause the sentencing judge to adjust the sentence from the starting point. Judges are free to decide a minimum term of any length or a "whole life" sentence but must state their reasons for deviations from the starting point.

== Responses ==
=== Passage through Parliament ===
The original bill's passage through Parliament did not meet with universal approval. The legal profession and civil liberties groups were opposed to several of the measures in the Bill, though most of them were contained within the final Act. John Wadham, the then Director of Liberty said

In years to come, as more innocent people emerge after years in prison caused by these plans, we'll wonder how Parliament let this shameful attack on justice get into law. Liberty's principal concerns relate to the removal of safeguards against wrongful conviction

The Bar Council and Criminal Bar Association published a joint document setting out their concerns about a number of measures in the Bill. In this the disclosure provisions, the requirement of the defence to disclose details of any expert they instruct, whether or not they go on to use them was referred to as a "major scandal" by Professor Michael Zander QC. The disclosure provisions generally were described by the Bar Council as placing an "unnecessary burden on the defence which does nothing to improve the prospect of conviction of the guilty".

Removal of jury trial was opposed on the ground that mere expediency (in cases of fraud) should never justify its removal, and that judge-alone acquittals of major City figures might cause "grave public disquiet". Jury-tampering might be protected against by better protection for jurors; there was also the danger that judges would hear secret evidence about intimidation or threats and then go on to try the defendant alone, which was again highly unsatisfactory. Re-trials for serious offences was opposed as a breach of a fundamental right, the Bar Council quoting Justice Hugo Black of the United States Supreme Court in Green v. United States:

The underlying idea ... deeply ingrained in at least the Anglo-Saxon system of jurisprudence, is that the State with all its resources and power should not be allowed to make repeated attempts to convict an individual for an alleged offence, thereby compelling him to embarrassment, expense and ordeal and compelling him to live in a continuing state of anxiety and insecurity as well as enhancing the possibility that even though innocent he may be found guilty

In the event the measures came into law, though with strict qualifications. The measures to expand admissibility of bad character evidence were also opposed on the grounds of unfairness (the defendant's past bad character can more easily be adduced than a witness's) and of dangerous irrelevance. The measures reforming hearsay, which were more closely modelled on the Law Commission's report than the other reforms, attracted less adverse attention, though the Bar Council disputed some of its aspects. The maximum period a suspected terrorist could be detained without charge was increased from 7 to 14 days. This was later increased to 28 days by the Terrorism Act 2006.

The act was also criticised by the Conservative Party for its lenient sentencing rules and handling of parole. Further fueling the controversy was the revelation that 53 prisoners who had been sentenced to life imprisonment under the Crime (Sentences) Act 1997 had been freed on parole since 2000.

=== Victims of crime and their families ===
Gill Smith, whose 18-year-old daughter Louise was murdered in December 1995, praised David Blunkett for giving judges the power to set longer minimum terms. Her daughter's killer, David Frost, was convicted of murder and sentenced to life but with a minimum of 14 years, as he had confessed to the crime as well as expressing remorse in court. Mrs Smith felt that 14 years was a very short time, especially when one of the men who tried to steal a diamond from the Millennium Dome was sentenced to 18 years. She criticised the judiciary for implying that a diamond was worth more than her daughter's life. (However, a person sentenced to 18 years is eligible for parole after 9 years.)

Denise Bulger, whose two-year-old son James was murdered by two 10-year-old boys in February 1993, criticised the legislation for insufficient severity. She protested that whole life sentences should apply to children who kill as well.

=== Judges ===
The Court of Appeal and the High Court have frequently passed adverse comment on the poor drafting of many provisions of the Act, which have resulted in numerous appeals to ascertain what the Act means. In March 2006 Lord Justice Rose, sitting in the Court of Appeal, said:

Time and again during the last 14 months, this Court has striven to give sensible practical effect to provisions of the Criminal Justice Act 2003, a considerable number of which are, at best, obscure and, at worst, impenetrable.

In December 2005, sitting in the High Court, he said:

So, yet again, the courts are faced with a sample of the deeply confusing provisions of the Criminal Justice Act 2003, and the satellite statutory instruments to which it is giving stuttering birth. The most inviting course for this Court to follow, would be for its members, having shaken their heads in despair, to hold up their hands and say: "the Holy Grail of rational interpretation is impossible to find". But it is not for us to desert our judicial duty, however lamentably others have legislated. But, we find little comfort or assistance in the historic canons of construction for determining the will of Parliament which were fashioned in a more leisurely age and at a time when elegance and clarity of thought and language were to be found in legislation as a matter of course rather than exception.
