= Negligence in employment =

Term in tort law

Negligence in employment encompasses several causes of action in tort law that arise where an employer is held liable for the tortious acts of an employee because that employer was negligent in providing the employee with the ability to engage in a particular act. Four basic causes of action may arise from such a scenario: negligent hiring, negligent retention, negligent supervision and negligent training. While negligence in employment may overlap with negligent entrustment and vicarious liability, the concepts are distinct grounds of liability. The doctrine that an employer is liable for torts committed by employees within the scope of their employment is called respondeat superior.

== Negligence ==
As with all negligence claims, the claimant must prove four elements:

- That the defendant (in this case, the employer) owed them a duty of care;
- That this duty was breached;
- That the claimant was injured as a result of the breach; (see Causation (law); Causation in English law) and
- The injury to the plaintiff was a reasonably foreseeable consequence of the breach.

In order for such a duty to exist, the injury to the claimant must be "reasonably foreseeable", meaning, for example, that the type of employment must be one in which an unfit employee could cause harm of the type which occurred, and the claimant is the type of person to whom such harm would be a "reasonably foreseeable consequence".

== Negligent hiring ==
Negligent hiring may be found where the employee (the tortfeasor) had a reputation or record that showed his/her propensity to misuse the kind of authority given by the employer, and this record would have been easily discoverable by the employer, had the employer exercised 'due diligence'. For example, a victim of sexual harassment in the workplace may have a cause of action for negligent hiring on the part of their employer if they can show that the employer was aware of the harasser's termination from a previous position for the same behaviour.

=== Negligent hiring preventive measures ===
In the sexual harassment example described above, the employer may be held liable for negligent hiring if the harasser had a previous history of harassment. This is because an employer has an obligation to its employees and others who will come in contact with them to provide a safe and productive working environment.

One preventive measure for negligent hiring is to perform a reasonable investigation on potential employees. This may include conducting interviews, verifying work and educational histories, checking references and conducting a background check on all applicants who have accepted an offer of conditional hire, and if an adverse assessment is found, to deny employment to such an applicant.

Note that simply conducting a criminal background check on an applicant may not be a sufficient investigation. In Minnesota, for example, such a check was determined to be insufficient by the court in Ponticas v. K.M.S. Investments, 331 N.W.2d 907 (Minn. 1983). This will not guarantee the employer will not be held liable, but it will show that the employer used a diligent search to screen potential harassers from the workplace, and will assist the employer in demonstrating that it took reasonable care in hiring. It is important to also note that, in the United States, background checks for job applicants are subject to the Fair Credit Reporting Act (2003). If an adverse assessment is found in an employment screen, the applicant has the right to dispute the report.

The majority of credible empirical research indicates that, likely due to employer concerns regarding negligent hiring liability, a criminal record has a significant negative effect on the hiring outcomes of ex-offenders.

== Negligent retention, supervision, and training ==
Negligent retention occurs where a party failed to remove an employee from a position of authority or responsibility after it became apparent that the employee was in fact misusing that authority or responsibility in a way that posed a danger to others.

Negligent supervision is closely related, as it occurs where a party fails to reasonably monitor or control the actions of an employee. A variation of negligent retention or supervision is negligent training, which arises where the employer's training of the employee fails to prevent the employee from engaging in the acts that injure the claimant, or fails to remediate a pattern of behaviour which leads to an injury. Suits for negligent retention often plead negligent supervision or training as an alternate theory, as the employer who knows of an employee's improper conduct should either terminate that employee, or take steps to penalise that conduct and/or train the employee not to engage in that conduct.

== Related doctrines ==
=== Negligent entrustment ===
Negligent entrustment arises where the entrustor is held liable for negligence because they negligently provided the entrustee with a dangerous instrument, and the entrusted party caused injury to a third party with that instrument. Where such a claim is brought against an employer, the employer will be held liable if the entrustee's record was known, or would have been easily discoverable, to the employer. For example, if a bus company hires a driver who has a record of reckless driving, of which the company could have learned through a search of publicly available records, the company would be liable for the negligent entrustment of the bus to that driver, should the driver cause an accident.

Negligent entrustment differs from negligent hiring, retention, supervision, and training in two key respects.

- First, negligent hiring and the related torts require the employment itself of the tortfeasor causing the injury, whereas a party can be held liable for negligent entrustment to any person.
- Second, an employer can be found liable for negligent hiring even without provision of any dangerous instrument to the employee. However, where an employer hires an unqualified person to engage in the use of a dangerous instrumentality, as in the above example with the bus driver, the employer may be liable for both negligent entrustment and hiring.

=== Vicarious liability ===
Vicarious liability is a separate theory of liability, which provides that an employer is liable for the torts of an employee under an agency theory, even if the employer did nothing wrong. The principle is that the acts of an agent of the company are assumed, by law, to be the acts of the company itself, provided the tortfeasor was acting within the course of his employment.

By contrast, each of the above negligence theories requires proof of actual negligence on part of the employer before the injury occurred, for example when the employee was first hired.
