= Bad character evidence =

Use of prior misbehavior as evidence in a court of law

The Criminal Justice Act 2003 applicable in England and Wales, and to a lesser extent Scotland and Northern Ireland, implemented fundamental changes to the admissibility of evidence relating to character, in respect to defendants and others. The Act is far-reaching, providing for the admissibility of previous convictions in support of a propensity to commit like-offences and untruthfulness. Common law rules in relation to the admissibility of bad character evidence have been abolished, with the existence of one exception.

The legislation draws heavily on the Law Commission Paper No. 273, with some deviations resulting from the Parliamentary debates as the Bill moved through Parliament.

== History ==
Before the changes brought about by the Criminal Justice Act 2003, evidence of a defendant's bad character—usually their previous criminal history—was inadmissible in a criminal trial unless it was relevant to the issues in dispute. In Maxwell v DPP, Lord Sankey described this as "one of the most deeply rooted and jealously guarded principles of our criminal law". Julius Stone disputes this and argues that the rule only emerged in the nineteenth century.

The reasons advanced for excluding bad character evidence were that it was unfairly prejudicial against defendants (juries and magistrates would be more likely to wrongly convict a defendant on the basis of past behaviour), and that it is comparatively weak evidence that can be used to buttress an otherwise flimsy case (as in the Scottish case of Oscar Slater). In a 2001 review of the criminal court system, Lord Justice Auld summed up the objections:

I should acknowledge my long held resistance, both at the Bar and as a judge, to putting a defendant’s previous convictions before a jury as part of the proof of guilt even under the present statutory regime. It has always seemed to me that it is a poor prosecution case that needs to rely on a man’s previous convictions in order to convict him. If the case is strong, why bother? If the case is weak, it is unfair.

Lawyers and academics have advanced a number of objections to the exclusion of defendant bad character evidence. One such objection is pragmatic: as defendants can advance their lack of prior convictions as evidence of good character, magistrates and jurors can draw an inference that silence on this point likely indicates the defendant has a criminal conviction.

In 1972, the Criminal Law Revision Committee recommended retaining the general exclusion, as did a Royal Commission in 1973, though both reports recommended different exceptions. The Law Commission was asked to consider it in 1994, and produced a consultation paper in 1996.

In 2001, the Government published Criminal Justice: The Way Ahead set out an "option for simplification", specifically allowing "evidence of previous convictions where relevant, providing their prejudicial effect does not outweigh their probative value". The 2001 review by Lord Justice Auld argued there was a "strong case" for reform. The 2001 Labour Party manifesto also expressed a commitment to "reform rules of evidence to simplify trials and bring the guilty to justice". When the Criminal Justice Bill was going through Parliament, the Home Affairs Select Committee expressed "strong concerns" about the change.

== Definition ==
Bad character evidence is evidence of, or a disposition towards misconduct; other than evidence which has to do with the alleged facts of the offence with which the defendant is charged or is evidence of misconduct in connection with the investigation or prosecution of that offence. Misconduct is defined as "the commission of an offence or other reprehensible behaviour".

Bad character in relation to the alleged facts of the offence itself has always been admissible for obvious reasons (and is excluded by the definition). The Act provides for different rules in relation to the bad character of defendants, and that of non-defendants. In assessing the probative value of evidence it is assumed to be true, unless there is material to suggest the contrary.

Admissible bad character evidence can include evidence of behaviour that has not led to a criminal conviction, and can include cases heard before foreign courts.

=== Statutory gateways ===
The Criminal Justice Act 2003 provides for seven statutory gateways for adducing bad character evidence of defendants:

1. (a) all parties to the proceedings agree to the evidence being admissible,
2. (b) the evidence is adduced by the defendant himself or is given in answer to a question asked by him in cross-examination and intended to elicit it,
3. (c) it is important explanatory evidence,
4. (d) it is relevant to an important matter in issue between the defendant and the prosecution,
5. (e) it has substantial probative value in relation to an important matter in issue between the defendant and a co-defendant,
6. (f) it is evidence to correct a false impression given by the defendant, or
7. (g) the defendant has made an attack on another person’s character.

For evidence to be considered "important explanatory evidence" under gateway (c), the "court or jury would find it impossible or difficult to understand other evidence in the case" if they were not able to consider it, and "its value for understanding the case as a whole is substantial".

Relevance to an "important matter in issue between the defendant and the prosecution" (under gateway (d)) can include the defendant's "propensity to commit offences of the kind with which he is charged, except where his having such a propensity makes it no more likely that he is guilty of the offence", and the defendant's "propensity to be untruthful". But it may also apply when it is relevant for reasons beyond propensity. For instance, if a defendant had stated they were reluctant to use a gun, a previous conviction involving the use of firearms may be considered an "important matter in issue" in the case.

== Exclusion of bad character evidence ==
The Criminal Justice Act does provide a specific provision for the exclusion of bad character evidence, where it may be excluded if it appears to the court that the admission of the evidence would have such an adverse effect on the fairness of the proceedings that the court ought not to admit it. Essentially, bad character evidence may be excluded on the grounds of unfairness.

The language of the Criminal Justice Act mirrors that of section 78 PACE 1984, with the difference of PACE stating that courts 'may' exclude evidence where its admission would be unfair, whilst the Criminal Justice Act states courts 'must' exclude such evidence. This may provide stronger protections for defendants where the language of the statute is imperative.

In addition to the statutory tests for exclusion of bad character evidence the power to exclude evidence under section 78 PACE 1984 Police and Criminal Evidence Act 1984 is not affected by the Criminal Justice Act 2003 provisions (House of Lords, Hansard, 19 November 2003, Col. 1988). Both provisions exist alongside one another.

== Criticisms ==
Academic commentators have criticized the use of the phrase "reprehensible behaviour" in section 112 of the Criminal Justice Act 2003. This language has not featured in any UK statute law before, and as such its interpretation has led to some inconsistent case law, where courts are subjectively interpreting whether evidence qualifies as "reprehensible behaviour" without clear precedent.

This language was introduced into the Act as it progressed through Parliament, with the original Law Commission Paper instead proposing that a reasonable person test, commonly featured in law in England and Wales, be used.
