= Negligent entrustment =

Form of civil wrongdoing

Negligent entrustment is a cause of action in United States tort law which arises where one party ("the entrustor") is held liable for negligence because they negligently provided another party ("the entrustee") with a dangerous instrumentality, and the entrusted party caused injury to a third party with that instrumentality. The cause of action most frequently arises where one person allows another to drive their automobile.

== General principles ==
One of the earliest reported cases under this cause of action, the 1915 Mississippi case of Winn v. Haliday, concerned the negligence of the father in entrusting a dangerous agency to a son known to be negligent, based on the allegation that the appellant knew his son to be given to 'joyriding'.

The key allegation that must be proven in such a case can be described as follows:

A plaintiff who invokes that doctrine must present evidence which creates a factual issue whether the owner knew, or had reasonable cause to know, that he was entrusting his car to an unfit driver likely to cause injury to others. Furthermore, in order to impose liability upon the owner, the plaintiff must prove that the negligent entrustment of the motor vehicle to the tortfeasor was a proximate cause of the accident.

Negligent entrustment is generally found where the entrustee had a reputation or record that showed his propensity to be dangerous through possession of such an instrumentality. Where the claim is against an employer, the employer will be held liable if the entrustee's record was known to the employer or would have been easily discoverable by that employer, had a diligent search been conducted. For example, suppose a bus company hires a driver who has a record of reckless driving, which the company could have learned of through a search of publicly available records. The company will be liable for the negligent entrustment of the bus to that driver, if the driver is in an accident.

Similarly, if A lends his handgun to B, knowing that B has a propensity for violence, A may be held to have negligently entrusted the gun to B when B uses the gun to shoot someone during an argument. However, such cases are often harder to prove than negligent entrustment cases involving employment, because judges and juries are less likely to find that an entrustor had a duty to check on the publicly available records of an entrustee who was merely a friend. Evidence in such cases is usually presented through testimony about entrustor's knowledge of the entrustee's reputation for violence, and of specific acts of violence committed by the entrustor.

=== Interaction with criminal law ===
The Supreme Court of the United States has held that negligent entrustment of a vehicle to a person with a criminal reputation will support the state's seizure of that vehicle as a penalty, if it is used in the commission of a crime.

=== Interaction with evidence law ===
Under Rule 404 of the Federal Rules of Evidence (F.R.E.), evidence of a person's character or a trait of his character is not admissible to prove he acted in conformity with his character on a particular occasion. However, as an exception, F.R.E. Rule 405(b) allows a person's character to be admitted in evidence to prove conduct when the character or trait of character of a person is an essential element of a charge or defense such as in the case of negligent entrustment.

=== Interaction with insurance ===
Several jurisdictions have case law which explores the relationship between negligent entrustment of a motor vehicle and typical exclusion clauses in household or general commercial insurance policies of claims "arising out of" the use of a motor vehicle. Insurers generally maintain a distinction between household or general insurance and motor insurance, such that damage caused to a third party through driving or other "use" of a motor vehicle should be dealt with through the latter. This distinction gives rise at times to a debate as to whether an entrustee's dangerous driving should be treated as a failure in the entrustee's "use" of the vehicle or an example on negligent entrustment on the part of the entrustor. See, for example, the Illinois case of Insurance Co. of North America v. Krigos, 1990, which upheld the District Court finding that wording in the entrustor's household insurance policy, We will not cover claims that arise because you or another person entrusts a motor vehicle to any person, "clearly and unambiguously excluded coverage for negligent entrustment".

== Related doctrines ==
=== Negligence in employment compared ===
Negligence in employment differs from negligent entrustment in two key respects. First, negligent employment requires that the injury was caused by the actual employment of the party. By comparison, a party can be held liable for negligently entrusting something to any person, whether that person is an employee or not. Second, an employee can be found liable for negligent hiring, retention, supervision or training even without provision of any dangerous instrumentality to the employee. However, where an employer hires an unqualified person to engage in the use of a dangerous instrumentality, as in the above example with the bus driver, the employer may be liable for both negligent entrustment and negligent hiring.

=== Vicarious liability compared ===
Vicarious liability is a separate theory of liability from negligent entrustment. The doctrine of vicarious liability provides that an employer is liable for the torts of an employee under an agency theory, even if the employer did nothing wrong; negligent entrustment, however, requires proof of actual negligence on part of the employer before the injury occurred, when the entrustee was entrusted with the dangerous instrumentality.
