= Law of California =

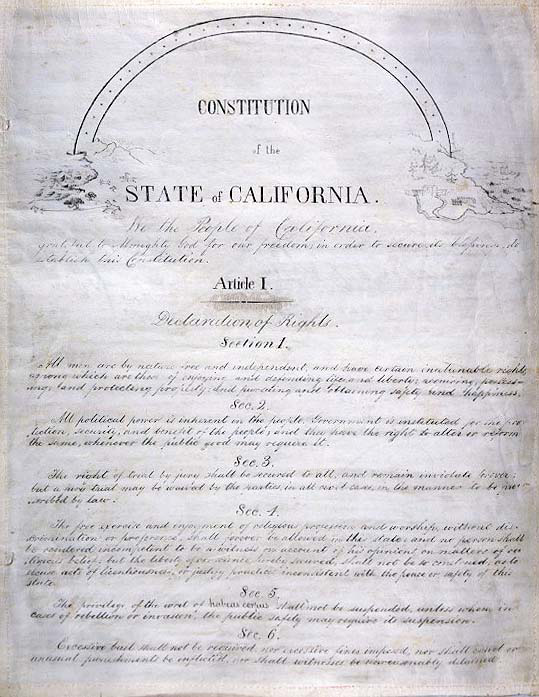
Title page of the original copy of the Constitution of California

The law of California consists of several levels, including constitutional, statutory, and regulatory law, as well as case law. The California Codes form the general statutory law, and most state agency regulations are available in the California Code of Regulations.

== Sources of law ==
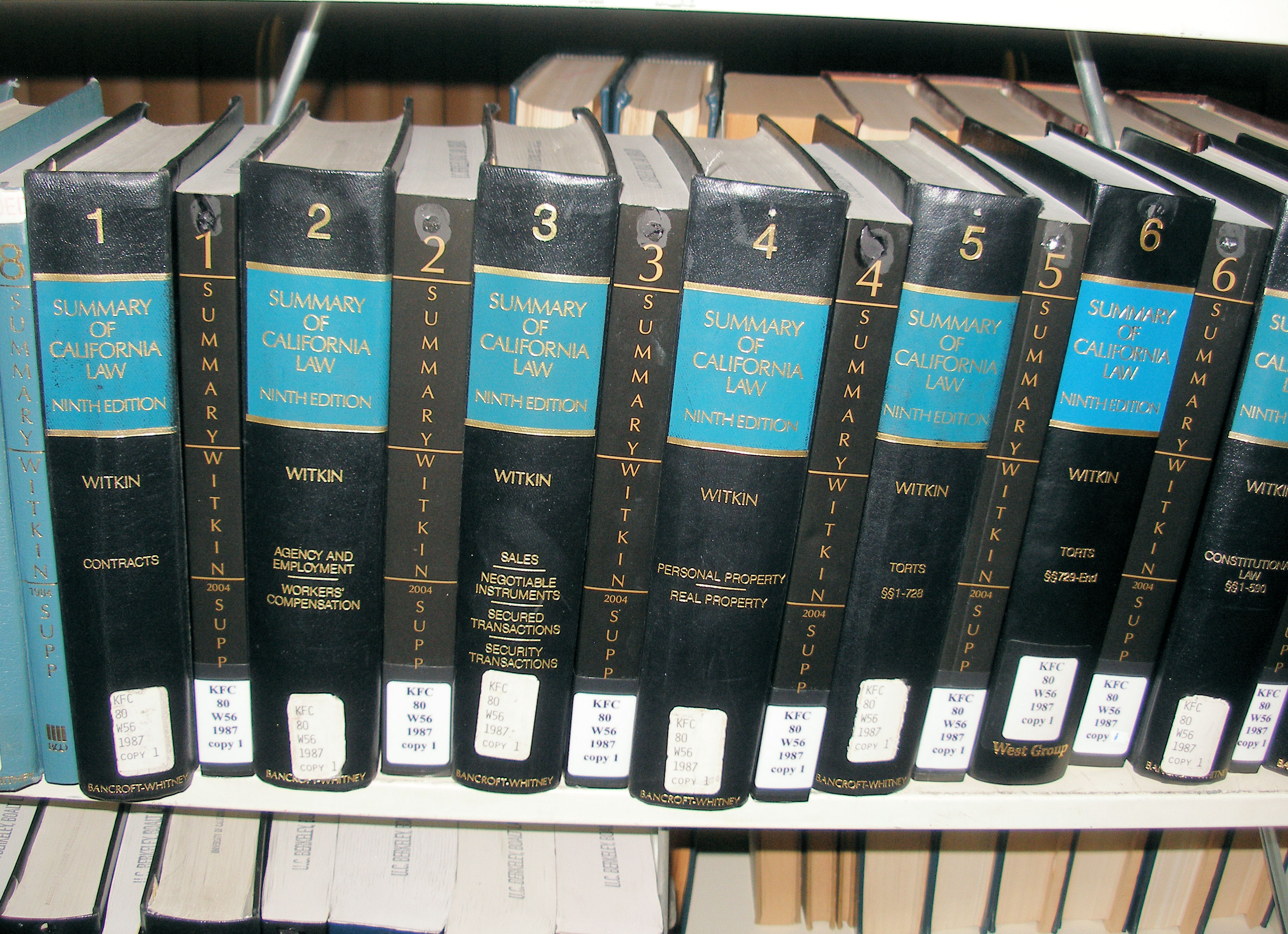
Bernard Witkin's Summary of California Law, a legal treatise popular with California judges and lawyers

The Constitution of California is the foremost source of state law. Legislation is enacted within the California Statutes, which in turn have been codified into the 29 California Codes. State agencies promulgate regulations with the California Regulatory Notice Register, which are in turn codified in the California Code of Regulations. California's legal system is based on common law, which is interpreted by case law through the decisions of the Supreme Court of California, California Courts of Appeal, and Appellate Divisions of the Superior Courts of California, and published in the California Reports, California Appellate Reports, and California Appellate Reports Supplement, respectively (among others). Counties and incorporated cities may promulgate local ordinances which are usually codified in county or city codes, respectively. There are also several sources of persuasive authority, which are not binding authority but are useful to lawyers and judges insofar as they help to clarify the state of the law. These include opinions by federal courts on state law, and opinions of other state courts on relevant issues.

=== Primary sources ===
==== Constitutional law ====
The foremost source of state law is the Constitution of California, which like other state constitutions derives its power and legitimacy from the sovereignty of the people. The California Constitution in turn is subordinate to the Constitution of the United States, which is the supreme law of the land.

==== Legislation ====
Pursuant to the state constitution, the California State Legislature and the Governor have enacted the California Statutes, which in turn have been codified into the 29 California Codes. The first four codes, enacted in 1872, were the Civil Code, the Code of Civil Procedure, the Penal Code, and the Political Code (which much later would become the Elections Code). However, these did not constitute a complete codification, and statutes on subject matter inappropriate for the four codes were simply not codified. In 1929, the Legislature finally established the California Code Commission as a permanent government agency (it had previously existed only intermittently on an ad hoc temporary basis), and it spent the next thirty years slowly codifying the rest of the California Statutes. Upon completing this task in 1953, the Code Commission was replaced by the California Law Revision Commission.

Strangely, although there is a Code of Civil Procedure, there was never a Code of Criminal Procedure; California's law of criminal procedure is codified in Part 2 of the Penal Code. The newest code is the Family Code, which was split off from the Civil Code in 1994.

==== Regulations ====
Front page of the California Regulatory Notice Register

Pursuant to certain broadly worded statutes, state agencies have promulgated an enormous body of regulations, which are codified in the California Code of Regulations (CCR) and carry the force of law to the extent they do not conflict with any statutes or the state or federal Constitutions. Pursuant to the California Administrative Procedure Act, a "Notice of Proposed Action" is published in the California Regulatory Notice Register (Notice Register) and at least 45 days are required for public hearings and comment before being reviewed and approved by the California Office of Administrative Law (OAL) and codified in the CCR.

The Judicial Council of California has also promulgated the California Rules of Court, which includes such publications as the Standards of Judicial Administration and the Ethics Standards for Neutral Arbitrators in Contractual Arbitrations, under the authority of article VI, section 6, of the Constitution of California.

==== Local ordinances ====
California has several different types of local governments throughout the state. California is divided into 58 counties, including San Francisco (a consolidated city–county with the powers of both types of entities) and municipal areas incorporated as cities. All of the state's territory is within one of the counties, but not all of it is within the boundaries of a city; the areas not under city control are called unincorporated areas and are directly managed by county governments. School districts, which are independent of cities and counties, handle public education. Many other functions, especially in unincorporated areas, are handled by special districts, which include municipal utility districts, transit districts, vector control districts, and geologic hazard abatement districts.

Counties and incorporated cities may promulgate ordinances which are usually codified in county codes and city codes, respectively. Every act prohibited or declared unlawful, and every failure to perform an act required, by the ordinances are misdemeanor crimes, unless otherwise specified as infractions.

==== Binding legal precedents ====
California's legal system is based on common law. Like all U.S. states except Louisiana, California has a reception statute providing for the "reception" of English law. California Civil Code Section 22.2 is as follows: "The common law of England, so far as it is not repugnant to or inconsistent with the Constitution of the United States, or the Constitution or laws of this State, is the rule of decision in all the courts of this State." This statute was signed into law on April 13, 1850, after several months of debate over whether California should adopt common law, civil law, or a hybrid of both. Governor Peter Hardeman Burnett touched off the debate by recommending to California's first state legislature that the state should borrow Louisiana's Civil Code and Code of Practice (that state's name for a code of civil procedure) and use the common law for everything else. A minority of lawyers led by John W. Dwinelle wanted to adopt the civil law, but the majority of lawyers and Senate Judiciary Committee chair Elisha Oscar Crosby wanted to adopt the common law, and the latter position was duly adopted by the Judiciary Committee in its report to the Senate in February 1850.

All statutes, regulations, and ordinances are subject to judicial review. They can be overturned by any state court of record if they impermissibly amend an initiative statute, are unconstitutional under the U.S. Constitution or the California Constitution, or be overturned by a federal court if they are unconstitutional under the U.S. Constitution.

Pursuant to common law tradition, the courts of California have developed a large body of case law through the decisions of the Supreme Court of California and the California Courts of Appeal. The state supreme court's decisions are published in official reporters known as California Reports. The decisions of the Courts of Appeal are published in the California Appellate Reports. Both official reporters are now in their fourth series.

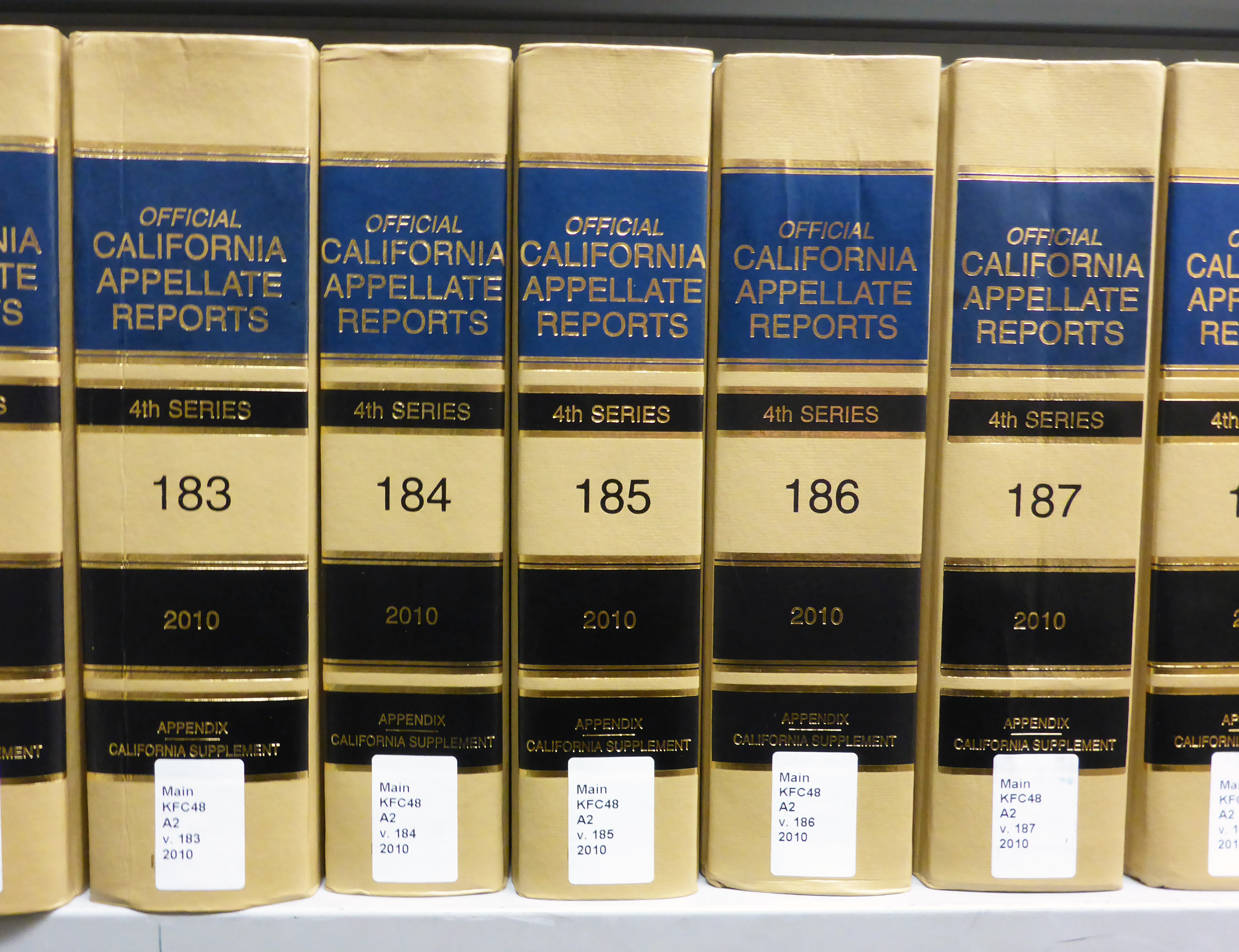
The California Appellate Reports, the official reporter of the Courts of Appeal

The content of both reporters is compiled and edited by the California Reporter of Decisions. The Reporter maintains a contract with a private publisher (as allowed by Government Code Section 68903) who in turn is responsible for actually publishing and selling the official reporters. The current official publisher is LexisNexis. In addition to the official reporters, published California cases are also printed in two Thomson West unofficial reporters: the regional Pacific Reporter and the state-specific California Reporter (both now in their third series).

All Supreme Court decisions are published, but less than 10% of Court of Appeal decisions are published. "Unpublished" decisions handed down after 1980 are generally available through the LexisNexis and Westlaw databases, but are useful only for academic researchers or as an aid in finding relevant published decisions. An unpublished decision in a criminal or civil action generally cannot be cited in any other action in any California court.

Because the state supreme court was extremely overloaded with cases during its first half-century (resulting in the creation of the Courts of Appeal in 1904), a few hundred minor opinions that should have been published simply were not. In response, a small group of lawyers later undertook the tedious task of plowing through the state archives to recover and compile such opinions, which were published in a separate reporter called California Unreported Cases starting in 1913. Despite the reporter's name, those decisions are also citable as precedent, since they would have been published but for the court's severely disorganized condition at the time they were issued.

The orders and decisions of the Superior Courts of California in their capacity as trial courts are never published. However, the appellate divisions of the superior courts (which hear appeals from infractions, misdemeanors, and "limited civil" cases) occasionally certify opinions for publication, which appear in a "Supplement" to the California Appellate Reports.

The California Court Case Management System (CCMS) is the court case management and electronic court filing (e-filing) system intended for use by the several courts, though development has been stalled since 2012. Since then, all courts not yet on CCMS have resorted to a variety of alternative solutions.

=== Secondary sources ===
==== Non-binding legal precedents ====
Even when a prior legal decision does not create a binding precedent, the text of the court's opinion may still help lawyers and judges understand California law. Some types of prior decisions may be cited as non-binding authority in California courts, while others can only be consulted informally.

The most powerful form of non-binding authority in California are the portions of appellate opinions known as dicta, in which a court discusses legal issues that it is not obligated to decide in the case before it. Dicta from the California Supreme Court is entitled to great weight, and the Court of Appeal rarely exercises its power to disregard the high court's gratuitous statements about California law.

Cases from other states are often cited in California appellate opinions, particularly when the out-of-state decisions disagree with one another. However, this occurs less in California than in smaller jurisdictions, because the state's tremendous size guarantees that most legal issues have already been decided by some prior California court.

Decisions from federal courts are also frequently cited as a source of persuasive authority about California law, even by the California Supreme Court. Although California courts have no obligation to follow federal precedents about matters of state law, they generally follow federal decisions on issues of federal law, even though they are only required to do so when an issue has been settled by the United States Supreme Court.

Unpublished decisions from California courts are also an important source of information about state law, even though they cannot be cited in future cases. Technically, the Court of Appeal is obligated to publish any opinion that materially contributes to the development of California caselaw, but this rule is not strictly followed, and the Court of Appeal often fails to publish opinions until a party submits a request to that effect.

==== Legal treatises ====
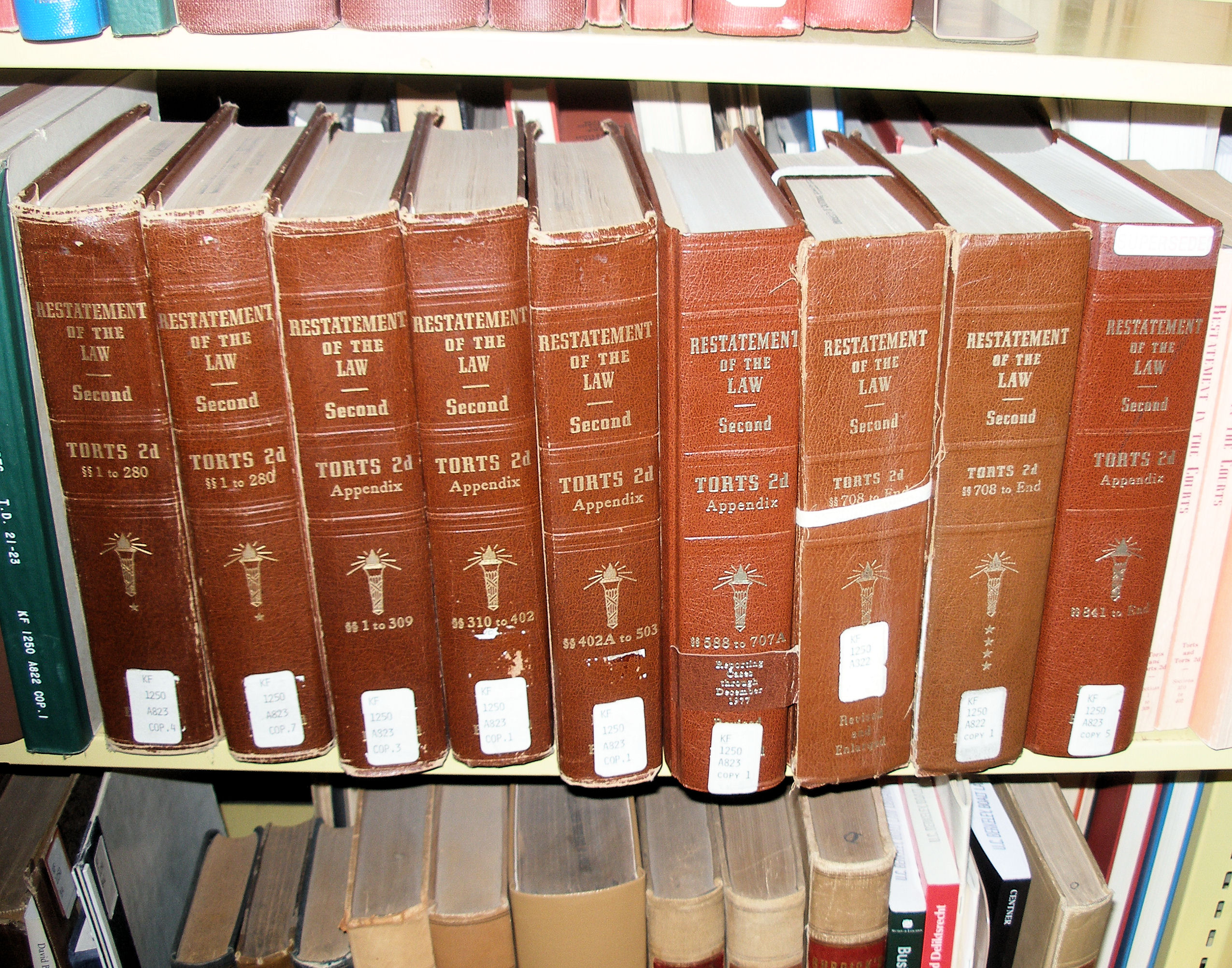
The Restatement (Second) of Torts

Legal treatises are one of the most important sources of secondary authority about California law. These texts are expressly recognized as a source of 'unwritten law' by California's Code of Civil Procedure.

The two most influential treatises are published by The Witkin Legal Institute Summary of California Law and The Rutter Group. Both are divided into discrete volumes about specific areas of the law, and each of the volumes is authored by a panel of judges and lawyers with special expertise in the particular topic. Collectively, these volumes have been cited thousands of times in judicial opinions.

== Unique features ==
Because California law is enormous, it is necessary to focus only on a few features which are unique to California law, when compared to the laws of its sister states as well as federal law.

=== Popular sovereignty ===
California has a powerful tradition of popular sovereignty, which is reflected in the frequent use of initiatives to amend the state constitution, as well as the former state constitutional requirement (repealed in 1966 and enacted as Government Code Section 100) that all government process shall be styled in the name of "the People of the State of California". (Government Code Section 100 also expressly states that sovereignty resides in the people.) This means that all criminal prosecutions and all enacted laws are done in the name of "the People", instead of "the State" or "the Commonwealth" as in much of the United States. The preambles of the state's two open meeting laws, the Brown Act and the Bagley-Keene Act, both contain the sentence: "The people of this state do not yield their sovereignty to the agencies which serve them."

=== Statutory structure and citation ===
California is unusual in that like Texas and New York, and unlike 46 other states, it has separate subject-specific codes instead of a single code divided into numbered titles. (Louisiana is a hybrid that uses both.)

During the state's first century, the California Legislature was rather sloppy in drafting statutes. This has resulted in two bizarre anomalies in California statutory law. First, some acts are designated as "Acts" and others are designated as "Laws", with no coherent distinction between the two. A typical example of this problem was in California consumer law, where an injured consumer previously could attempt to sue on behalf of all similarly injured consumers under the Unfair Competition Law and the Consumers Legal Remedies Act until 2004 when voters enacted Proposition 64 requiring the person filing suit to claim to be aggrieved by the alleged violation(s).

The second oddity is that California is the only state that always precedes a citation to statute subsections with the word "subdivision" (abbreviated in some contexts to "subd."). The reason is that the Legislature often failed to leave gaps in the section numbering in the California codes for future expansion, and then occasionally resorted to the shortsighted technique of appending an alphabetical letter to a section number in order to insert a new section between two existing sections on similar subject matter. For example, the summary judgment statute in California is Section 437c of the Code of Civil Procedure. But alphabetical letters are traditionally used in the U.S. to designate subsections of statutes. To avoid confusion as to whether one is citing section 437c (that is, the section with number 437c) or 437(c) (subsection (c) of the section numbered 437), the "subdivision" prefix must be used when citing any subsection of all California statutes.

Similar to New York, but unlike most other states and the federal judiciary, nearly all of California civil procedure law is located in the Code of Civil Procedure (a statute) rather than in the California Rules of Court (a set of regulations promulgated by the judiciary). Therefore, whenever the Judicial Council of California identifies a significant defect in California civil procedure, it must lobby the Legislature and the Governor to change the statutes, rather than merely promulgating a simple rule change. This can be problematic as even noncontroversial technical amendments may be stalled due to unrelated disputes between the Legislature and Governor. A recent example is the California Electronic Discovery Act, which was vetoed in October 2008 (along with many other bills) by Governor Arnold Schwarzenegger simply as his expression of disgust with the Legislature's inability to fix the state's dysfunctional budget, rather than because of any substantive defect in the bill itself. The Electronic Discovery Act had to be reintroduced in the next legislative session and was finally signed by the Governor on June 29, 2009.

=== Codification ===
Unlike the majority of states, contract law is fully codified in the Civil Code (which even includes details such as a definition of consideration). However, the Restatement of Contracts (Second) is also used by California courts. Non-compete clauses are automatically void except for a small number of exceptions.

Evidence privileges are fully codified in the California Evidence Code (meaning if it is not codified it does not exist), in contrast to the Federal Rules of Evidence, which has allowed a residual exception for continuous development of privileges under the common law.

=== Celebrity justice ===
The huge concentration of celebrities in Hollywood has resulted in a large number of statutes custom-tailored to the needs of celebrities, such as the California Celebrities Rights Act, as well as the 1990 enactment of the first anti-stalking law anywhere in the United States (which inspired the enactment of similar laws across the country). Celebrities' marital problems (and their ability to pay to litigate them thoroughly) have resulted in a very detailed Family Code, a rich corpus of family case law, and a large number of family law specialists officially certified by the State Bar of California. Lee Marvin, Barry Bonds, and Frankie Valli are among the celebrities whose marital disputes were litigated before the Supreme Court of California. Celebrities' spouses often attempt to establish California jurisdiction over marital disputes, since the state's community property system (under which a 50/50 split of marital assets is strictly mandated by statute) is more favorable to the noncelebrity spouse who earned less during the marriage than the celebrity spouse.

The widespread distribution of Hollywood motion pictures and television shows has given millions of media consumers worldwide some degree of superficial familiarity with California law. For example, the section numbers of the California Penal Code have become familiar to viewers around the world. Section 187 (murder) is probably the most well-known.

=== Powerful, innovative or controversial laws ===
The Unruh Civil Rights Act and the California Fair Employment and Housing Act are among the most powerful civil rights laws in the United States. Both offer much broader coverage and, in the case of the Unruh Act, more generous remedies than their federal equivalents. California appellate courts were the first in the United States to begin carving out exceptions to at-will employment, in 1959.

The California Environmental Quality Act (Public Resources Code Sec. 21000, et seq.) (CEQA) has far more lenient standing requirements than the federal National Environmental Policy Act, with the result that it is much easier for California landowners to sue each other than comparable landowners in other states.

California is renowned for its innovations in tort law, including strict liability for defective products, insurance bad faith, market-share liability, negligent infliction of emotional distress, and wrongful life.

The California three strikes law (codified in the Penal Code) has resulted in severe penalties in some cases and has been somewhat controversial in its application.

Proposition 13, passed by California voters in 1978, created one of the strongest limits on property tax in the country. The law limits a property's total tax rate for all local governments to 1% of "taxable value". Taxable value is defined as the most recent purchase price of the property, plus increases each year of 2% or the rate of inflation, whichever is lower.

== See also ==
- California State Legislature
- Davis-Stirling Common Interest Development Act
- Van Camp accounting, one of two methods for classifying community property in California
- Pereira accounting, the other major method for classifying community property in California
