= California Administrative Procedure Act =

Series of acts of the California Legislature

The California Administrative Procedure Act (APA) is a series of acts of the California Legislature first enacted 15 June 1945 that requires California state agencies to adopt regulations in accordance with its provisions. It predates the federal Administrative Procedure Act that was enacted almost a year later on 11 June 1946.

== Overview ==
The act allows the public to participate in the adoption of state regulations in order to ensure that the regulations are clear, necessary, and legally valid. The act allows that, as long as a person is not limited by a statute, any interested person can petition a state agency to change regulation. These changes include the adoption of a new regulation or the amendment or repeal of an existing one. According to the act, an agency can adopt a new regulation only if it is within their scope of authority and consistent with state law. The act explicitly states that in any area where state or federal regulations may conflict with the act, state or federal regulations should be held superior.

The act created the Office of Administrative Law. The director of this agency is appointed by the governor and subject to confirmation by the senate. The director appoints a staff of full-time attorneys, and any other technical or clerical positions that need to be filled. The California Administrative Procedure act can be found in California Government Code sections 11340-11365.

== History ==
The original Administrative Procedure Act was California Senate Bill 705 of 1945, Chapter 867 of the California Statutes of 1945, signed by Governor Earl Warren on 15 June 1945. It had been proposed by the Judicial Council of California, whose report relied heavily on the report of the Attorney General's Committee on Administrative Procedure. It was further modified by Chapter 1425 of the Statutes of 1947. Assembly Bill 1111 of 1979, Chapter 567 of the Statutes of 1979, signed by Governor Jerry Brown on 11 September 1979 further modified this, and was passed dependent on Senate Bill 772 and Assembly Bill 939 of the same session. A.B. 1111 replaced the existing Office of Administrative Hearings within the Department of General Services with the Office of Administrative Law.

Senate Bill 523 of 1995, Chapter 938 of the Statutes of 1995, was a major revision of the APA.

== Criticism ==
The California Administrative Procedure Act has been criticized for being wrapped in unneeded bureaucracy. A California Performance Review report describes how the act contains numerous layers of housekeeping details that increase cost and delay without adding value to the resulting regulations. For example, the Office of Administrative Law is required to review each proposed regulation for necessity. The OAL interprets this to mean describing the necessity of each individual provision in the Initial Statement of Reasons for the regulation. The CPR sees this as unnecessary.

The CPR report suggests that the governor and the legislature work together to amend the act. Changes suggested include simplifying rulemaking documents to the original 1979 requirements containing only the minimum number of documents and clarifying that necessity can be shown by demonstrating the overall necessity, and not calling for the necessity of each individual provision.

Exceptions for the California State Board of Equalization, the Franchise Tax Board, and the California Public Utilities Commission contained in S.B. 523 have been criticized, as well as their non-APA procedures.

With few exceptions, the California State Personnel Board is exempt from the Administrative Procedure Act. However, even when subject to the Act, it is exempt from a variety of the Act's most onerous requirements, such as performing an adverse economic impact analysis.

== See also ==
- California Regulatory Notice Register
- California Code of Regulations
- Administrative Procedure Act
- California Government Code
