= Innovative Clean Transit rule =

Innovative Clean Transit
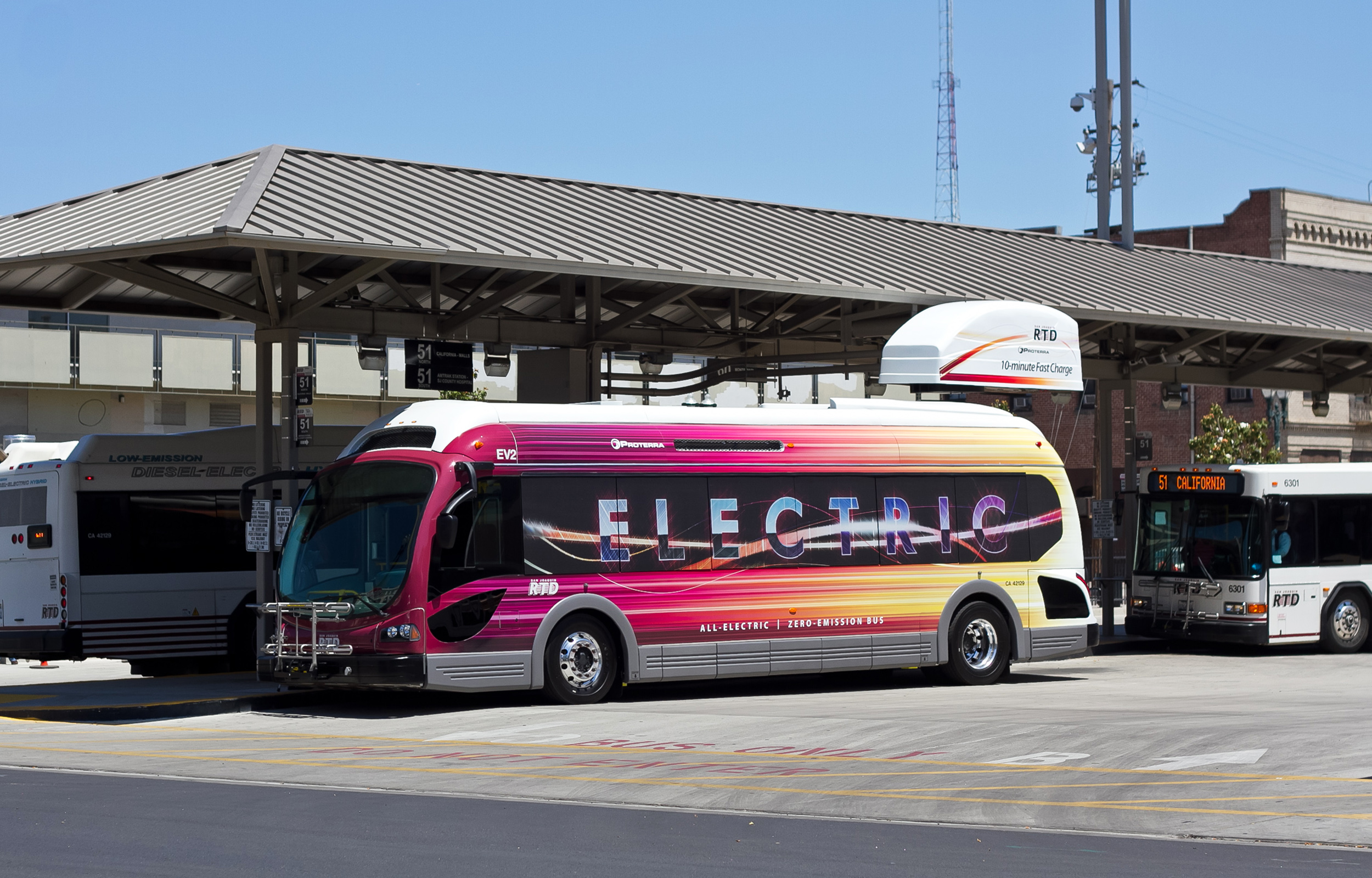
- A Proterra BE35 battery-electric bus operated by San Joaquin RTD, shown beside its fixed charging station.

California Air Resources Board
- Citation: Title 13, California Code of Regulations, Section 2023 (13 CCR 2023)
- Enacted by: California Office of Administrative Law
- Enacted: August 13, 2019
- Effective: October 1, 2019
- Status: Current legislation

The Innovative Clean Transit Rule (ICT) is a regulation promulgated by the California Air Resources Board which requires public transit agencies in the state of California to shift their bus fleets to zero emissions buses (ZEB), either electric buses or fuel cell buses. By 2029, only ZEBs will be allowed for new bus purchases, and the entire fleet must use ZEBs by 2040.

== History ==
CARB's first regulation to control transit fleet emissions was the Fleet Rule for Transit Agencies, Section 2023 under Title 13 of the California Code of Regulations (CCR); 13 CCR §2023 was adopted in February 2000 after diesel particulate matter was identified as a toxic air contaminant. The Fleet Rule effectively shifted most agencies off diesel fuel. A similar regulation (13 CCR §2022) was issued in 2005 to cover trucks owned by public agencies and utilities, and expanded via 13 CCR 2025/2027 as the 2008 California Statewide Truck and Bus Rule to all diesel-fueled trucks and buses in California.

The ICT rule was adopted in December 2018. ICT amends the existing Fleet Rule. It is the first such ZEB mandate in the United States, and was supported unanimously by CARB's sixteen-member board, led by then-chair Mary D. Nichols.

=== Fleet Rule ===
Under the previous Fleet Rule, transit agencies were required to meet emissions requirements for urban buses under a "diesel path" or "alternative fuel path", with the exception of agencies in the South Coast Air Quality Management District (SCAQMD), which were required to follow the "alternative fuel path". SCAQMD separately mandated that diesel-fueled buses would no longer be purchased (Rule 1192, adopted June 2000), and later amendments to the Fleet Rule required transit agencies in the SCAQMD to choose the "alternative fuel path" by October 7, 2006. Urban buses were defined as vehicles that have a capacity of at least 15 passengers and were intended for intra-city operation. The regulations were extended in 2005 to apply to smaller vehicles operated by transit agencies, including the maintenance fleet.

The Fleet Rule required that transit agencies choose their path by January 31, 2001. Under the "alternative fuel path", at least 85% of urban buses purchased were required to use alternative fuels or with engines that met the emissions requirements of 13 CCR 1956.1. Under the "diesel path", average fleet emissions for NO_{x} and diesel particulate matter (PM) were gradually tightened. For both paths, diesel PM emissions were calculated as a fleet total and compared to the fleet diesel PM emissions in 2002; starting in 2004, diesel PM were required to be 60% or less (diesel path) or 80% or less (alternative fuel path) of the 2002 values, followed by ≤40% (diesel) or ≤60% (alternative) by 2005, and continuing to decrease in future years.

In addition, under the Fleet Rule, agencies with large fleets (more than 200 buses) were required to participate in the Zero Emission Bus (ZEB) demonstration program. ZEBs were defined as buses with electric motor drivetrains that drew from traction batteries, hydrogen fuel cell, or overhead wire via trolley poles. The Initial Demonstration Project was required to have at least three ZEBs in revenue service for one calendar year, to start no later than February 28, 2006. In addition, large transit agencies on the "diesel path" were required to implement an Advanced ZEB Demonstration Project, using a minimum of six ZEBs in revenue service for one calendar year, to start no later than January 1, 2009. Starting in 2011 (diesel path) or 2012 (alternative fuel path), transit agencies were required to make ZEBs a minimum of 15% of their new purchases/leases through 2026, with additional credits earned for early implementation.

=== Pilot ZEB programs ===
CARB funded a pilot program for the San Joaquin Valley Air Pollution Control District to help transit agencies including Visalia Transit, FCRTA (Fresno County), San Joaquin RTD, and MAX (Modesto) purchase battery-electric buses from Proterra starting in 2016. However, the ICT rule was much broader than the individual regional programs, eliminating all transit vehicle emissions and applying to all transit agencies state-wide.

== Requirements ==
Under ICT all public transit agencies in the state will gradually transition their fleets to zero emissions buses, with the goal of having all operating buses on the road by zero-emissions by 2040. ICT applies to all agencies in the state that own, operate, or lease buses with a Gross Vehicle Weight greater than 14,000 lb (6,400 kg). Individual transit agencies have varying requirements under the rule, depending on their size, but by the year 2029, all new transit bus purchases must by zero-emissions buses.

CARB estimated the rule would reduce greenhouse gas emissions by 19 million metric tons, the equivalent of taking four million cars off the road.

=== Transition schedules and plans ===
ZEB proportion of annual new bus purchases
	Large (Note: Large agencies are defined as those with 65 buses or more in the South Coast or San Joaquin Valley APCDs, or 100 buses or more elsewhere.)	Small
2023–25	25%	0%
2026–28	50%	25%
2029+	100%	100%

Large transit agencies are required to have 25% of new bus purchases as zero-emission buses (ZEBs) starting in 2023, 50% of new purchases as ZEBs starting in 2026, and 100% of new purchases as ZEBs starting in 2029. Small transit agencies are required to make 25% of new purchases as ZEBs in 2026 and 100% of new purchases as ZEBs in 2029 and all years thereafter. An agency is considered large if it operates at least 100 buses, or if it operates at least 65 buses in the San Joaquin Valley or the SCAQMD.

Under ICT, agencies are required to develop and submit rollout plans for their operations to transition to zero-emissions. Large agencies must complete their plans by July 1, 2020, and small agencies must complete their plans by July 1, 2023.

=== Scope ===
Per the regulation, ZEBs are defined to include battery electric buses and fuel cell buses, but do not include electric trolleybuses which draw power from overhead lines. Those are exempt from the regulation as they are already electric. The rule does not apply to any vehicle operated by Caltrans, Caltrain, Amtrak, or any local school district. It also does not apply to trolleybuses or any vehicle that operates on rails or a fixed guideway.

== Implementation ==
The Antelope Valley Transit Authority (AVTA) has set a goal to be the first all-electric fleet by the end of 2018, ahead of the tightened regulations. The Los Angeles Department of Transportation also plans to complete its transition well in advance of the state mandate, by 2026. The San Francisco Municipal Transit Agency plan to purchase only electric buses starting 2025, to complete the transition by 2035.

In April 2020, AVTA decommissioned its last diesel transit bus; in September 2020, AVTA began replacing its microtransit (demand-responsive) fleet with battery-electric vans, and in August 2021, AVTA began replacing its commuter/highway coach fleet with battery-electric buses, completing their transition to an all-electric fleet in March 2022. This made AVTA the first all-electric transit agency in North America.
