= California Law Revision Commission =

Independent state agency of California

Agency overview
- Formed: 1953
- Agency executive: Sharon Reilly, Executive Director
- Website: http://www.clrc.ca.gov/

The California Law Revision Commission (CLRC) is an independent California state agency responsible for recommending reforms of state law. The agency was created in 1953 and advises both the Governor and state legislators on reforming state laws.

== Duties ==
The CLRC makes recommendations to the California State Legislature to correct defects in California statutory law and to bring that law into harmony with modern conditions. The CLRC may only study matters that have been expressly authorized by legislative resolution or statute.

Some of the CLRC's studies are purely technical. For example, in 2006 the CLRC was directed to recodify the Penal Code provisions relating to deadly weapons, to make them easier to use and understand without making any change in the outcomes under those laws. Other CLRC studies involve significant legal and policy issues. For example, in 2013 the CLRC was directed to make recommendations to modernize California law on state and local government access to the customer records of communication service providers.

CLRC studies vary widely in scope. Some involve the revision of a single code section, while others have created or recodified entire codes of law. For example, the CLRC drafted the California Evidence Code.

== Staff ==
Seven of the CLRC's ten members are appointed by the Governor for four year terms, with the advice and consent of the California Senate. One Member of the Senate is appointed by the Senate Committee on Rules, one Member of the Assembly is appointed by the Speaker of the Assembly, and the Legislative Counsel serves ex officio.

The Commission's staff consists of its executive director, chief deputy counsel, two staff attorneys, and two administrative support staff. The current executive director is Sharon Reilly.

== Location ==
The CLRC currently maintains its main office at UC Davis School of Law and a branch office at Cubberley Community Center in Palo Alto.

== Code Commission ==
The CLRC is the successor to the California Code Commission, which itself was the successor to a series of earlier ad hoc codification commissions. The Code Commission was established in 1929. It spent 24 years codifying the massive body of uncodified law that had accumulated (and continued to accumulate) in the California Statutes, because the original California Codes were not a comprehensive codification.

After the Code Commission completed the monumental task of codifying virtually all general California statutory law into the California Codes, it recommended the creation of the CLRC, as a permanent law reform body.

== See also ==
- Little Hoover Commission
