= California Evidence Code =

California legal code

The California Evidence Code (abbreviated to Evid. Code in the California Style Manual) is a California code that was enacted by the California State Legislature on May 18, 1965 to codify the formerly mostly common-law law of evidence. Section 351 of the Code effectively abolished any remnants of the law of evidence not explicitly included in it. However, except for division 8, the Evidence Code only applies to judicial proceedings in the California state courts, and do not apply to any legislative, administrative or arbitral proceedings.

== See also ==
- California Codes
- Federal Rules of Evidence
- Law of California
