= CLRA =

CLRA may refer to:

- California Consumers Legal Remedies Act
- Congress of Local and Regional Authorities
- Construction Labour Relations Association, whose president is Terry French
