= California Statutes =

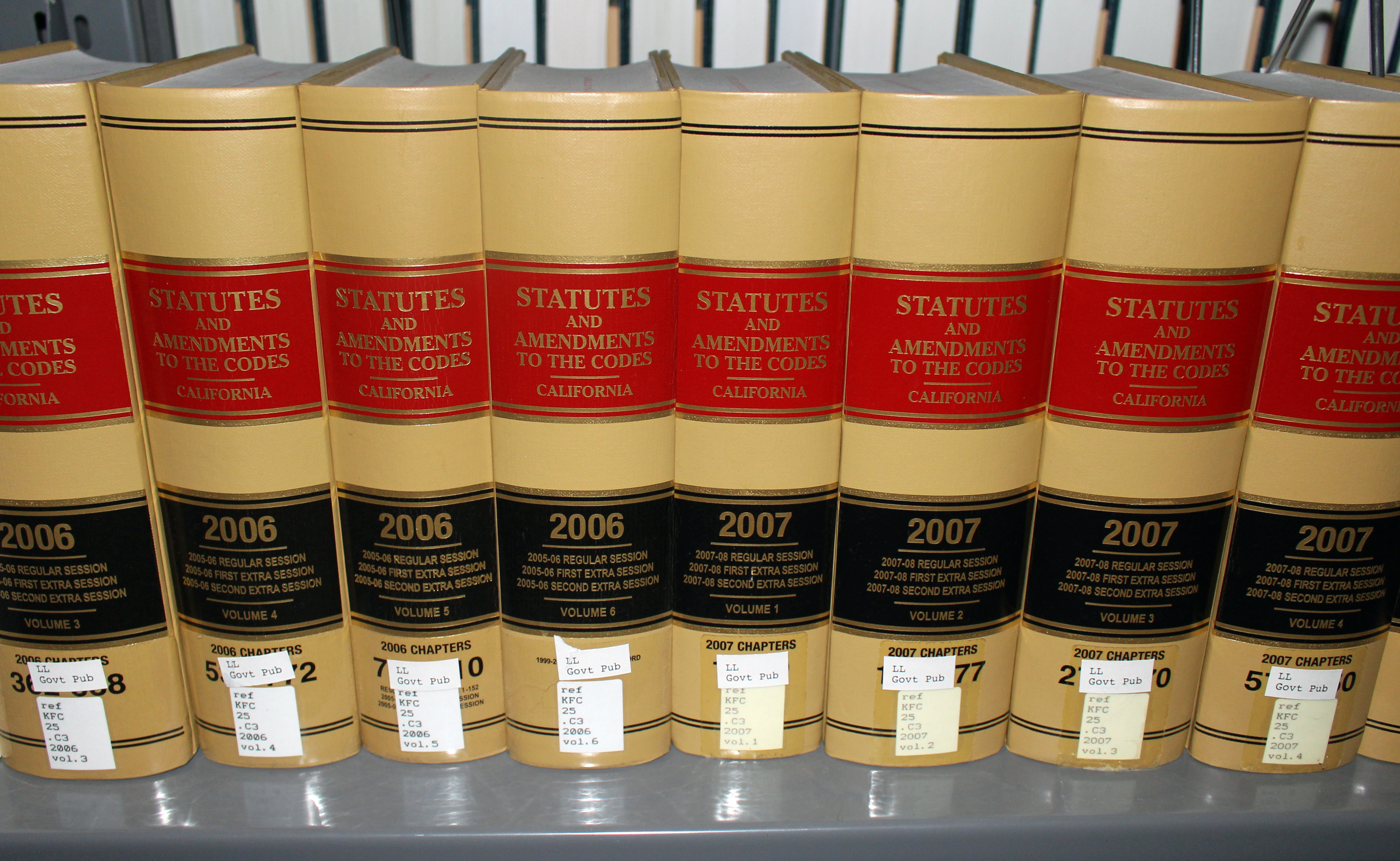
California Statutes (formally titled Statutes and Amendments to the Codes)

California Statutes (Cal. Stats., also cited as Stats. within the state) are the acts of the California State Legislature as approved according to the California Constitution and collated by the Secretary of State of California.

A legislative bill is "chaptered" by the Secretary of State once it passes through both houses of the California State Legislature and has either been signed by the Governor or has become law without the Governor's signature. The secretary of state assigns a sequential chapter number to all bills that become law. Statutes are cited by chapter and year, but legislative bills are also referred to by the bill number assigned by the Assembly or Senate when the bill is introduced.

== Codification ==
Since the 1950s, virtually all general laws enacted as part of the California Statutes have been drafted as modifications to one of the 29 California Codes, each covering a general area of the law. One legislative bill may make changes in the statutes in a number of codes. For example, laws that relate to civil relations generally fall in the Civil Code; those relating to the rules of evidence in court proceedings generally fall in the Evidence Code; those relating to crimes and punishments generally fall in the Penal Code; etc. A searchable database of all 29 Codes, as well as the California Constitution, is maintained by the California Legislative Counsel.

Regulations adopted by California state agencies are generally codified in the separate California Code of Regulations (CCR).

== See also ==
- California Codes
- Law of California
- United States Statutes at Large
