= Van Camp accounting =

Van Camp accounting is one of the two methods California community property law uses to deal with community funds and/or labor used to enhance the value of separate property. The method is named after a 1921 divorce case, Van Camp v. Van Camp.

To calculate, courts will value the manager's services at a market rate and subtract community expenses from that amount. The result is considered community property. The effect of this is that the net income earned by the owner of the separate property results in the manner in which income is treated under California law, which is community property. This method is preferred when the character of the business is the reason for its income. In the case where the management is the main cause for growth and production, Pereira accounting should be used.

Van Camp is used when the appreciation of the business is due to the nature of the economy or the type of business. In that case, the community property is awarded what that spouse might have been paid as an employee for similar work. The remainder is the worker's separate property.

If capital (rather than spousal or community labor) is the chief factor contributing to a large gain in the value of the business and if labor by the spouse not holding title to the business was compensated fairly during the marriage, the Van Camp method will allocate most of the appreciation in value to the titleholder as separate property.

Van Camp accounting can be applied when the increased value is due to the unique nature of the SP (Separate Property) asset, such as market timing, a world class management team, or a large number of contributing employees. In this case: Fair salary for community labor x years of marriage – salary already received – amounts already paid to community expenses = CP (Community Property); the rest is SP.

== Choosing the correct apportionment or accounting method ==
Van Camp accounting is typically chosen when the business itself or economic factors produced the profits (typically larger and generally more capital-intensive businesses).

Pereira accounting is typically chosen when the business was spousal labor-intensive (typically smaller and/or labor-intensive businesses).
