= California Regulatory Notice Register =

Government gazette of California

- Cover
- Type: Weekly government gazette
- Publisher: California Office of Administrative Law
- Language: English
- ISSN: 1041-2654
- Website: oal.ca.gov/california_regulatory_notice_online/

The California Regulatory Notice Register (Notice Register or Z Register) contains notices of proposed regulatory actions by California state agencies to adopt, amend, or repeal regulations contained in the California Code of Regulations (CCR). It is similar to the role of the Federal Register.

A state agency must complete its rulemaking and submit the rulemaking file to the California Office of Administrative Law (OAL) within one year of the date of publication of a "Notice of Proposed Action" in the Notice Register. The OAL publishes the Notice Register every Friday. Unlike the Federal Register, California regulations are not normally published in the Notice Register, meaning that until they are codified in the CCR they must be obtained from the individual agencies or elsewhere.

== See also ==
- California Code of Regulations
- Law of California
- Federal Register
