= California Office of Legislative Counsel =

American government agency

Legislative Counsel Bureau
Legislative Counsel overview
- Formed: 1913; 113 years ago
- Jurisdiction: State of California
- Headquarters: Capitol Office, 1021 O Street, Suite 3210, Sacramento, CA 95814
- Employees: 600
- Legislative Counsel executive: Cara L. Jenkins, Legislative Counsel of California
- Website: legislativecounsel.ca.gov

The California Office of Legislative Counsel (OLC) (referenced in statute by its original name, the Legislative Counsel Bureau) was founded in 1913 and is a nonpartisan public agency that drafts legislative proposals, prepares legal opinions, and provides other confidential legal services to the Legislature and certain other California agencies and offices. The OLC also provides computer services, data networking, customer support, and related technology services to the Legislature. This includes hosting the California Legislative Information Website where the official versions of legislative measures, statutes contained within the Codes of California, the California Constitution, various legislative publications, and other resources, are published. The head of the office, known as the Legislative Counsel of California, is appointed by a vote of the Legislature.

The OLC is separate from the California Legislative Analyst's Office, which is the Legislature's nonpartisan fiscal and policy advisor.

As of 2024, the Legislative Counsel of California is Cara L. Jenkins, who first was appointed in 2020. The agency's main office, historically located within the State Capitol Building, moved with other legislative offices to an interim office building during the Capitol Annex project.
