= California Codes =

Legal codes enacted by the California State Legislature

The California Codes are 29 legal codes enacted by the California State Legislature, which, alongside uncodified acts, form the general statutory law of California. The official codes are maintained by the California Office of Legislative Counsel for the legislature. The Legislative Counsel also publishes the official text of the Codes publicly at leginfo.legislature.ca.gov.

== Codes currently in effect ==
The 29 California Codes currently in effect are as follows:

Name of code	Date of adoption	Original source
Business and Professions Code	June 15, 1937	Stats. 1937, Ch. 399, pp. 1229–1326
Civil Code	March 21, 1872	(Haymond 1872, vol. 1 and vol. 2)
Code of Civil Procedure	March 11, 1872	(Haymond 1872, vol. 1 and vol. 2)
Commercial Code	June 8, 1963	Stats. 1963, Ch. 819, pp. 1849–2015
Corporations Code	July 1, 1947	Stats. 1947, Ch. 1038, pp. 2309–2441
Education Code	April 7, 1943	Stats. 1943, Ch. 71, pp. 310–792
Elections Code	February 2, 1939	Stats. 1939, Ch. 26, pp. 49–318
Evidence Code	May 18, 1965	Stats. 1965, Ch. 299, pp. 1297–1370
Family Code	July 13, 1992	Stats. 1992, Ch. 162, pp. 463–722
Financial Code	May 15, 1951	Stats. 1951, Ch. 364, pp. 829–1158
Fish and Game Code	May 21, 1957	Stats. 1957, Ch. 456, pp. 1308–1499
Food and Agricultural Code	March 15, 1967	Stats. 1967, Ch. 15, pp. 44–825
Government Code	April 13, 1943	Stats. 1943, Ch. 134, pp. 896–1032
Harbors and Navigation Code	May 25, 1937	Stats. 1937, Ch. 368, pp. 792–1004
Health and Safety Code	April 7, 1939	Stats. 1939, Ch. 60, pp. 482–1003
Insurance Code	May 7, 1935	Stats. 1935, Ch. 145, pp. 496–780
Labor Code	April 24, 1937	Stats. 1937, Ch. 90, pp. 185–329
Military and Veterans Code	July 5, 1935	Stats. 1935, Ch. 389, pp. 1338–1418
Penal Code	February 14, 1872	(Haymond 1874)
Probate Code	May 11, 1931	Stats. 1931, Ch. 281, pp. 587–687
Public Contract Code	September 21, 1981	Stats. 1981, Ch. 306, pp. 1434–1447
Public Resources Code	April 26, 1939	Stats. 1939, Ch. 93, pp. 1067–1216
Public Utilities Code	May 31, 1951	Stats. 1951, Ch. 764, pp. 2025–2258
Revenue and Taxation Code	May 16, 1939	Stats. 1939, Ch. 154, pp. 1274–1377
Streets and Highways Code	March 27, 1935	Stats. 1935, Ch. 29, pp. 248–353
Unemployment Insurance Code	April 21, 1953	Stats. 1953, Ch. 308, pp. 1457–1553
Vehicle Code	September 15, 1935	Stats. 1935, Ch. 27, pp. 93–247
Water Code	May 13, 1943	Stats. 1943, Ch. 368, pp. 1604–1896
Welfare and Institutions Code	May 25, 1937	Stats. 1937, Ch. 369, pp. 1005–1183

== Repealed codes ==
The following codes have been repealed:

Name of code	Date of adoption	Original source	Replaced by
Agricultural Code	February 7, 1933	Stats. 1933, Ch. 25, pp. 60–298	Food and Agricultural Code
Banking Code	June 24, 1949	Stats. 1949, Ch. 755, pp. 1376–1488	Financial Code
Political Code	March 12, 1872	(Haymond 1872, vol. 1 and vol. 2)	Government Code
School Code	March 28, 1929	Stats. 1929, Ch. 23, p. 45	Education Code

== Influence elsewhere ==
The California Codes have been influential in a number of other U.S. jurisdictions, especially Puerto Rico. For example, on March 1, 1901, Puerto Rico enacted a Penal Code and Code of Criminal Procedure which were modeled after the California Penal Code, and on March 10, 1904, it enacted a Code of Civil Procedure modeled after the California Code of Civil Procedure. Thus, California case law interpreting those codes was treated as persuasive authority in Puerto Rico.

In 1941, the Puerto Rican Legislative Assembly joined the nationwide movement towards transferring civil procedure and evidentiary law into a system of rules promulgated by the courts, then abolished the judicial power to promulgate rules in 1946, then reinstated it in 1952 (subject to the right of the legislature to amend court rules before they went into effect). Eventually, after much of its content was superseded by the Rules of Civil Procedure and the Rules of Evidence, most of the Code of Civil Procedure of Puerto Rico was rendered obsolete and was therefore repealed. However, although the Penal Code of Puerto Rico underwent extensive recodification and renumbering in 1974, many of its sections still bear a strong resemblance to their California relatives.

The Code of Guam, implemented in 1933 by Governor George A. Alexander, was modeled after the California Codes. Thus, Guam courts look to California case law to assist them with interpretation of the Code of Guam.

== History ==
In 1868, the California Legislature authorized the first of many ad hoc Code Commissions to begin the process of codifying California law. Each Code Commission was a one- or two-year temporary agency which either closed at the end of the authorized period or was reauthorized and rolled over into the next period; thus, in some years there was no Code Commission. The first four codes enacted in 1872 were the Civil Code, the Code of Civil Procedure, the Penal Code, and the Political Code. Statutes that did not fit these categories were simply left uncodified in the California Statutes.

The four original California Codes were not drafted from scratch, but were mostly adapted by the Code Commission from codes prepared for the state of New York by the great law reformer David Dudley Field II. As a result of the Gold Rush, many New York lawyers had migrated to California, including Field's brother, Stephen Johnson Field, who would ultimately serve as California's fifth Chief Justice before being appointed to the U.S. Supreme Court. The strong New York influence on early California law started with the California Practice Act of 1851 (drafted with the help of Stephen Field), which was directly based upon the New York Code of Civil Procedure of 1850 (the Field Code). In turn, it was the California Practice Act that served as the foundation of the California Code of Civil Procedure. New York never enacted Field's proposed civil or political codes, and belatedly enacted his proposed penal and criminal procedure codes only after California, but they were the basis of the codes enacted by California in 1872.

As noted above, the initial four codes were not fully comprehensive. As a result, California statutory law became disorganized as uncodified statutes continued to pile up in the California Statutes. After many years of on-and-off Code Commissions, the California Code Commission was finally established as a permanent government agency in 1929. In its first report, the Commission stated: "The California statutory law is in a deplorable condition ... law writers and publishers unite in considering it the worst statutory law in the country." To staff the new permanent incarnation of the Code Commission, the state Legislature simply appointed the Legislative Counsel as the secretary of the Commission. Thus, as a practical matter, most of the real work was performed by the Legislative Counsel's deputies and then approved by the Code Commissioners.

The Commission spent the next 24 years analyzing the massive body of uncodified law in the California Statutes and drafting almost all the other codes. By 1953, when the Code Commission completed its assigned task and issued its final report on September 1 of that year, 25 Codes were then in existence. That year, the legislature replaced the Code Commission with the California Law Revision Commission. Since then, the CLRC has been tasked with regularly reviewing the codes and proposing various amendments to the legislature. Most of these are simple maintenance amendments to ensure that statutory cross-references are properly updated to add new laws or omit laws which no longer exist.

The newest code is the Family Code, which was split off from the Civil Code in 1994. Although there is a Code of Civil Procedure, there is no Code of Criminal Procedure. Instead, criminal procedure in California is codified in Part 2 of the Penal Code, while Part 1 is devoted to substantive criminal law.

== Interpretation ==
The Codes contain, or are supposed to only contain general statutory law, with the emphasis on the word "general". The legislature also regularly enacts a variety of other resolutions which are not laws of general application, such as annual budget bills, appropriation bills for specific periods of time, acts authorizing the purchase or disposition of land by the state government, and acts authorizing the issuance of bonds which terminate automatically upon repayment of the bonds. The legislature also regularly approves resolutions honoring the accomplishments of various distinguished persons. Because of their limited application, all such matters are not incorporated into the Codes.

The Codes form an important part of California law. However, they must be read in combination with the federal and state constitutions, federal and state case law, and the California Code of Regulations, in order to understand how they are actually interpreted and enforced in court. The Civil Code is particularly difficult to understand since the Supreme Court of California has treated parts of the Code as a mere restatement of the common law. For example, in Li v. Yellow Cab Co., the Supreme Court acknowledged the Legislature's original intent in enacting Civil Code section 1714 to codify a contributory negligence scheme subject to the last clear chance doctrine, then held the legislature had not intended to freeze the common law in place and proceeded to judicially adopt comparative negligence. In contrast, other codes, such as the Probate Code and the Evidence Code, are considered to have fully displaced the common law, meaning that cases interpreting their provisions always try to give effect whenever possible to the Legislature's intent.

As noted above, the Legislative Counsel maintains an online website with the official text of the Codes. The original four codes were printed as separate state documents in 1872 (but not as part of the California Statutes), and were also published by commercial publishers in various versions, including as a set in 1872. In lieu of an official set, unofficial annotated codes are widely available from private publishers. West publishes West's Annotated California Codes and LexisNexis publishes Deering's California Codes Annotated. Although Deering's is much older, West is the more popular of the two annotated codes. Libraries that lack sufficient shelf space to carry both codes—usually because they are small law libraries, public libraries serving the general public (as distinguished from public law libraries), or out-of-state libraries—usually carry only West and omit Deering's.

There are also a handful of relatively minor statutes which were never codified and are not included in the Legislative Counsel's online copy, but probably should have been codified as they are laws of general application. For example, certain initiative acts could not be codified by an act of the legislature because they were originally enacted by popular vote of the electorate. The final Code Commission report of September 1, 1953 recommended that such statutes should be published in an appendix to whichever code they are most relevant and not grouped into a separate volume. The unofficial annotated codes include those statutes either as appendixes to the codes in which they probably should have been codified, or within annotations to particular code sections; Deering's also prints the uncodified initiative acts in a separate volume.

== See also ==
- California Statutes
- California Code of Regulations
