= California Office of Administrative Law =

American government agency

Office of Administrative Law
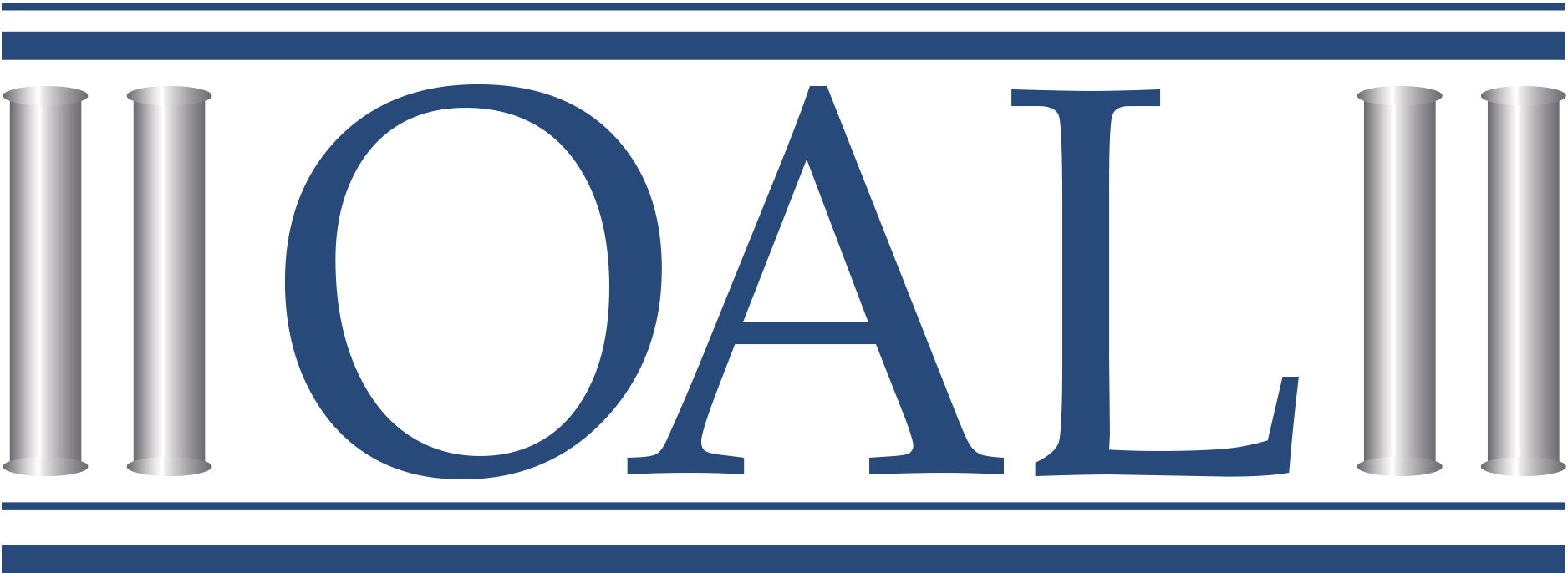

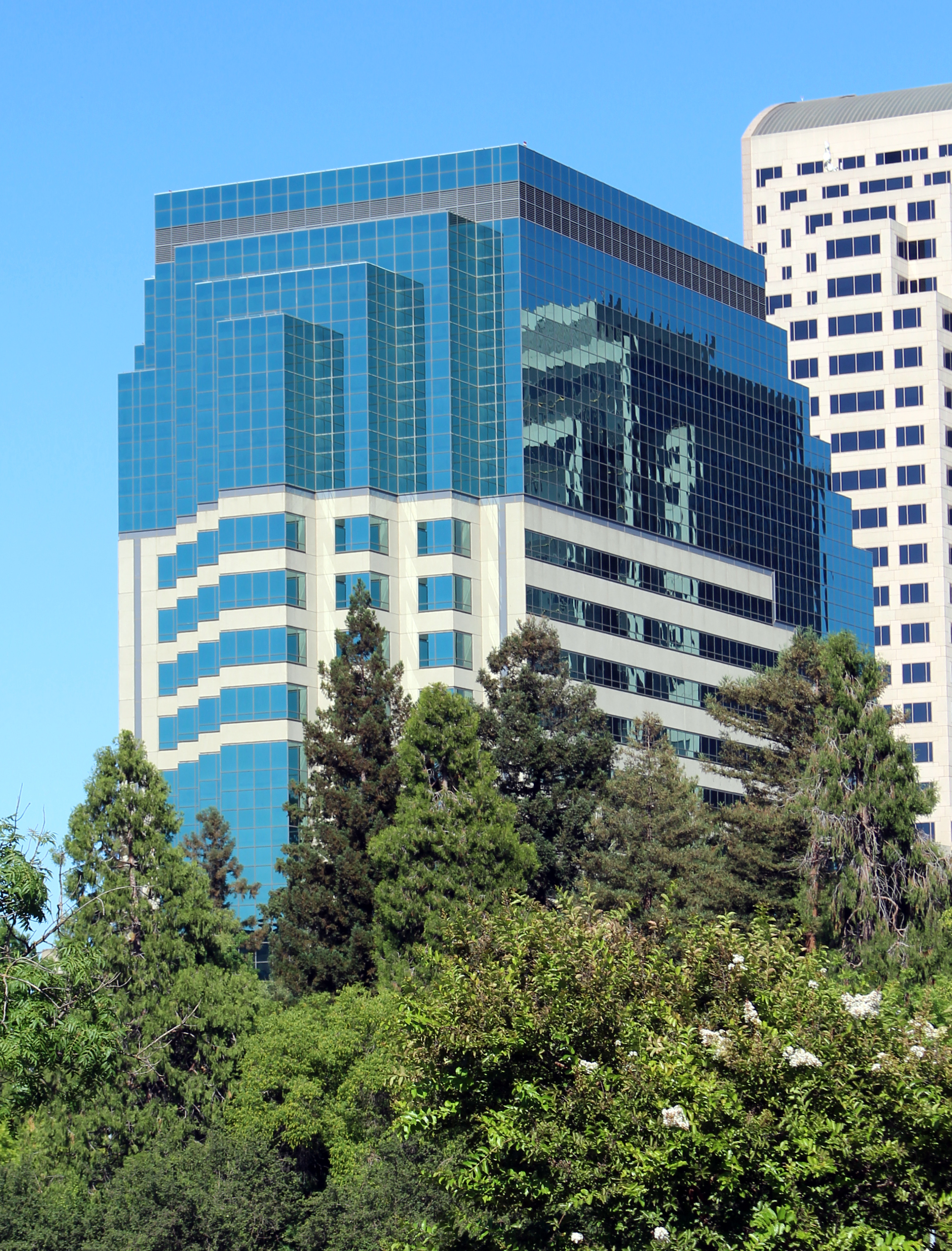
- OAL headquarters at 300 Capitol Mall in Sacramento

Agency overview
- Formed: September 11, 1979
- Preceding agency: Office of Administrative Hearings
- Jurisdiction: California
- Agency executive: Debra Cornez, director
- Parent agency: California Government Operations Agency
- Key document: California Administrative Procedure Act California Assembly Bill 1111 of 1979
- Website: oal.ca.gov

The California Office of Administrative Law (OAL) is the California agency responsible for carrying out the rulemaking part of the California Administrative Procedure Act. It is overseen by the California Government Operations Agency.

The OAL is responsible for publishing the weekly California Regulatory Notice Register and the resulting California Code of Regulations (CCR).

== List of directors ==
Director	Tenure
Debra M. Cornez	April 11, 2012 – current
Debra M. Cornez (acting)	January 3, 2011 – April 10, 2012
Susan A. Lapsley	May 10, 2007 – January 2, 2011
William L. Gausewitz	July 27, 2004 –
