= California Consumers Legal Remedies Act =

The California Consumers Legal Remedies Act ("CLRA") is the name for California Civil Code §§ 1750 et seq. The CLRA declares unlawful several "methods of competition and unfair or deceptive acts or practices undertaken by any person in a transaction intended to result or which results in the sale or lease of goods or services to any consumer". Forbidden practices include misrepresenting the source of the good and services, representing reconditioned goods as new, advertising goods without having the expected demand in stock, representing a repair is needed when it is not, representing rebates that have hidden conditions, and misrepresenting the authority of a salesman to close a deal.

The CLRA claim is attractive to potential plaintiffs because Cal. Civ. Code § 1780 allows consumers who suffer damage as a result of a practice declared unlawful by § 1770 to obtain actual damages (the total award of damages in a class action shall be more than $1,000); an order enjoining the methods, acts, or practices; restitution of property; punitive damages; court costs and attorney's fees; and any other relief that the court deems proper. A prevailing plaintiff gets to recover their attorney's fees, but a prevailing defendant usually may not recover their attorney's fees.
