= Pereira accounting =

Pereira accounting is one of the two manners in California community property law that explains how to deal with community funds and/or labor used to enhance the value of separate property. The method is named after a 1909 divorce case, Pereira v. Pereira. To calculate, courts will add the original principal amount of the business which is separate property to a reasonable rate of return expected from the nature of that business. The result is considered separate property. The remaining amount of the business is considered part of the community. This method is preferred when the management of the spouse was the primary cause of the growth or productivity of the business. In the case where the character of the business is the main reason for its growth and production, Van Camp accounting should be used.

Pereira is used when the appreciation of the business is due to the skills, efforts or talents of the spouse who is working in the business. In that case, the separate property is awarded the initial investment plus a reasonable interest rate, as if the capital had been invested. The remainder of the profits are community property. Typical businesses that would be considered for Pereira accounting: single person professions or very small businesses such as sole proprietorships, or businesses where the efforts of the owner-spouse comprise more than 50% of the labor to grow the company's value.

== Choosing the correct apportionment or accounting method ==
Pereira accounting is typically chosen when the business was spousal labor-intensive (typically smaller and/or labor-intensive businesses).

Van Camp accounting is typically chosen when the Business itself or economic factors produced the profits (typically larger and generally more capital intensive businesses).
