= California Code of Regulations =

- Language: English

Publication details
- Publisher: California Office of Administrative Law (California, United States)
- Frequency: Weekly

Standard abbreviations
- ISO 4: Calif. Code Regul.

Indexing
- LCCN: 73158911
- OCLC no.: 29706248

Links
- Journal homepage; Online access

The California Code of Regulations (CCR, Cal. Code Regs.) is the codification of the general and permanent rules and regulations (sometimes called administrative law) announced in the California Regulatory Notice Register by California state agencies under authority from primary legislation in the California Codes. Such rules and regulations are reviewed, approved, and made available to the public by the Office of Administrative Law (OAL), and are also filed with the Secretary of State.

The CCR consists of 28 titles and contains the regulations of approximately 200 regulatory agencies. Title 24, the California Building Standards Code, is not maintained by the OAL but by the California Building Standards Commission. It has been alleged that the regulations have substantial portions under copyright (e.g., Title 24, the California Building Standards Code), but Title 24, California Code of Regulations, though administered and authored by the Building Standards Commission of the State of California, including the building, residential, electrical, mechanical, plumbing, energy, historical building, fire, existing building, green building, and referenced standards codes applicable in the state of California along with the standards incorporated by reference into these codes, is considered to be in the public domain. In Veeck v. SBCCI, the 5th Circuit of the United States Court of Appeals ruled:

"As law, the model codes enter the public domain and are not subject to the copyright holder's exclusive prerogatives."

The regulations have the force of California law. Some regulations, such as the California Department of Social Services Manual of Policies and Procedures concerning welfare in California, are separately published (i.e., "available for public use in the office of the welfare department of each county").

Its role is similar to the Code of Federal Regulations. Unlike the Federal Register, California regulations are not normally published in the Notice Register, meaning that until they are codified in the CCR they must be obtained from the individual agencies or elsewhere.

== History ==
The CCR's predecessor, the California Administrative Code (CAC), resulted from efforts that began in 1941 to codify the growing body of state regulations. In 1988, the Legislature renamed the CAC to the CCR to reduce confusion with the enacted statutory codes.

The OAL contracts with Barclays, a division of Thomson Reuters, to provide a free online version of the official CCR, which is currently provided on the Web through a Westlaw-based interface. In 2008, Carl Malamud published title 24 of the CCR, the California Building Standards Code, on Public.Resource.Org for free, even though the OAL claims publishing regulations with the force of law without relevant permissions is unlawful. In March 2012, Malamud published the rest of the CCR on law.resource.org.

In February 2013 California State Assemblyman Brian Nestande (R-42) introduced AB 292 that would mandate the CCR be published under a Creative Commons license.

== Procedure ==
Regulations are reviewed, approved, and made available to the public by the California Office of Administrative Law (OAL) pursuant to the California Administrative Procedure Act (APA). The California Regulatory Notice Register contains notices of proposed regulatory actions by state regulatory agencies to adopt, amend, or repeal regulations contained in the CCR. A state agency must complete its rulemaking and submit the rulemaking file to OAL within one year of the date of publication of a Notice of Proposed Action in the Notice Register. The OAL publishes the Notice Register every Friday.

== List of regulation titles ==
- Title 1: General Provisions
- Title 2: Administration
- Title 3: Food and Agriculture
- Title 4: Business Regulations
- Title 5: Education
- Title 6: Governor's Regulations (empty)
- Title 7: Harbors and Navigation
- Title 8: Industrial Regulations
- Title 9: Rehabilitative and Developmental Services
- Title 10: Investment
- Title 11: Law
- Title 12: Military and Veterans
- Title 13: Motor Vehicles
- Title 14: Natural Resources
- Title 15: Crime Prevention and Corrections
- Title 16: Professional and Vocational Regulations
- Title 17: Public Health
- Title 18: Public Revenues
- Title 19: Public Safety
- Title 20: Public Utilities and Energy
- Title 21: Public Works
- Title 22: Social Security
- Title 23: Waters
- Title 24: California Building Standards Code
- Title 25: Housing and Community Development
- Title 26: Toxics
- Title 27: Environmental Protection
- Title 28: Managed Health Care

== See also ==
- California Regulatory Notice Register
- Law of California
- Code of Federal Regulations
