= California State Legislature =

Bicameral legislature of California

Coordinates: 38.576572°N 121.493411°W

- 2025–26 session
- Great Seal of the State of California

Type
- Type: Bicameral
- Houses: Senate (upper); Assembly (lower)
- Term limits: 12 years

History
- New session started: December 2, 2024

Leadership
- Senate President: Eleni Kounalakis (D) since January 7, 2019
- Assembly Speaker: Robert A. Rivas (D) since June 30, 2023

Structure
- Seats: 120; 40 Senators; 80 Assemblymembers
- Senate political groups: Democratic (29); Republican (10)
- Assembly political groups: Democratic (60); Republican (20)

Elections
- Last Senate election: November 5, 2024 (20 seats)
- Last Assembly election: November 5, 2024
- Next Senate election: November 3, 2026 (20 seats)
- Next Assembly election: November 3, 2026

Meeting place
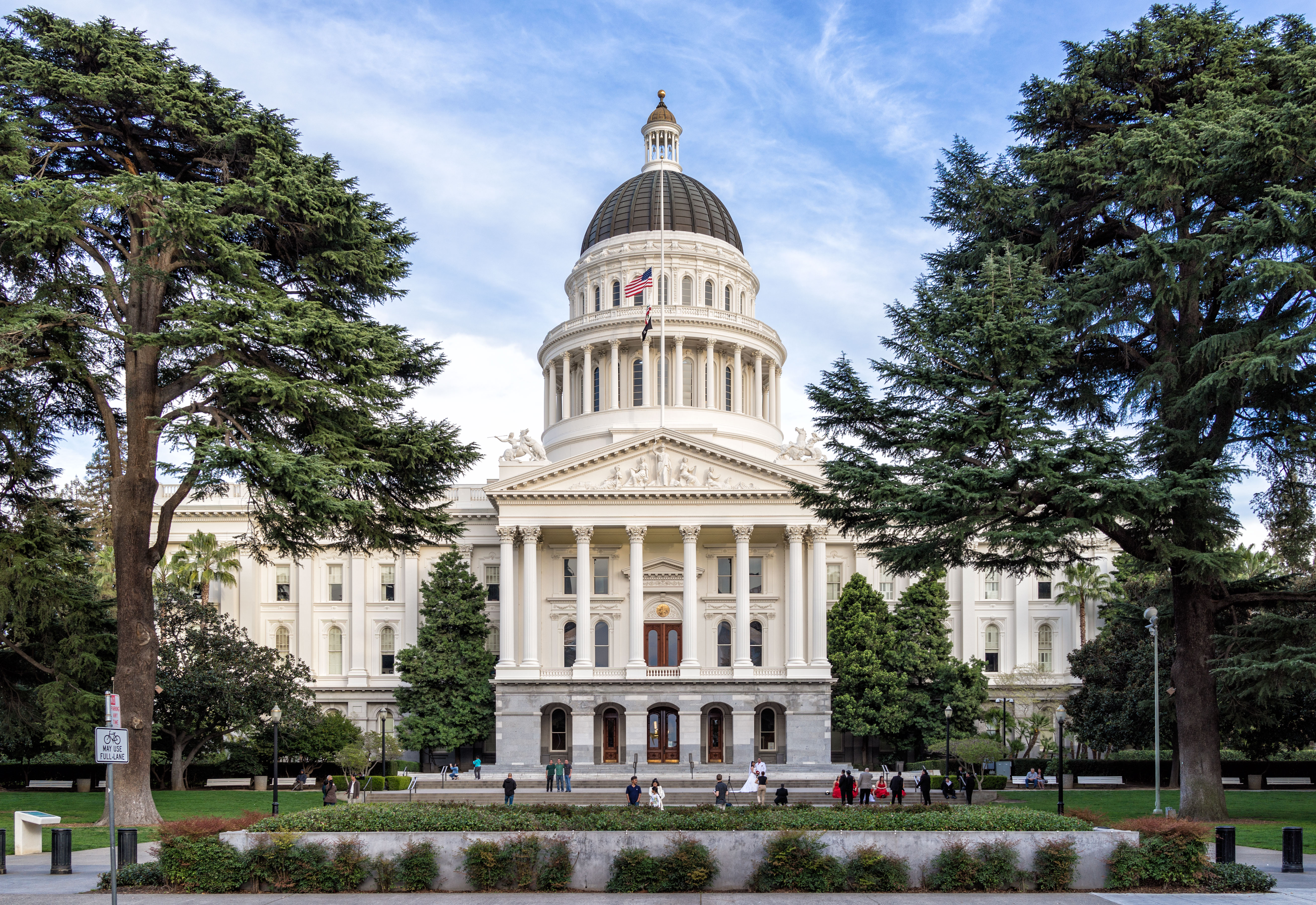
- California State Capitol; Sacramento

Website
- leginfo.legislature.ca.gov

Constitution
- Constitution of California

Rules
- Joint Rules of the Senate and Assembly

The California State Legislature is the bicameral state legislature of the U.S. state of California, consisting of the California State Assembly (lower house with 80 members) and the California State Senate (upper house with 40 members). Both houses of the Legislature convene inside the California State Capitol in Sacramento.

The California State Legislature is one of ten full-time state legislatures in the United States. The houses are distinguished by the colors of the carpet and trim of each house: the Senate uses red and the Assembly uses green, inspired by the United Kingdom's House of Lords and House of Commons respectively.

The Democratic Party currently holds veto-proof supermajorities in both houses of the California State Legislature. The Assembly consists of 60 Democrats and 20 Republicans, while the Senate is composed of 30 Democrats and 10 Republicans. Except for a brief period from 1995 to 1996, the Assembly has been in Democratic hands since the 1970 election. The Senate has been under Democratic control since 1975.

== History ==
=== Mexican era legislature ===
In 1822, Alta California formed its first legislative body, the Diputación de Alta California, a body of seven members (vocales), each representing one of the four presidio military districts or the three civilian pueblos.

=== 1849 Constitution ===
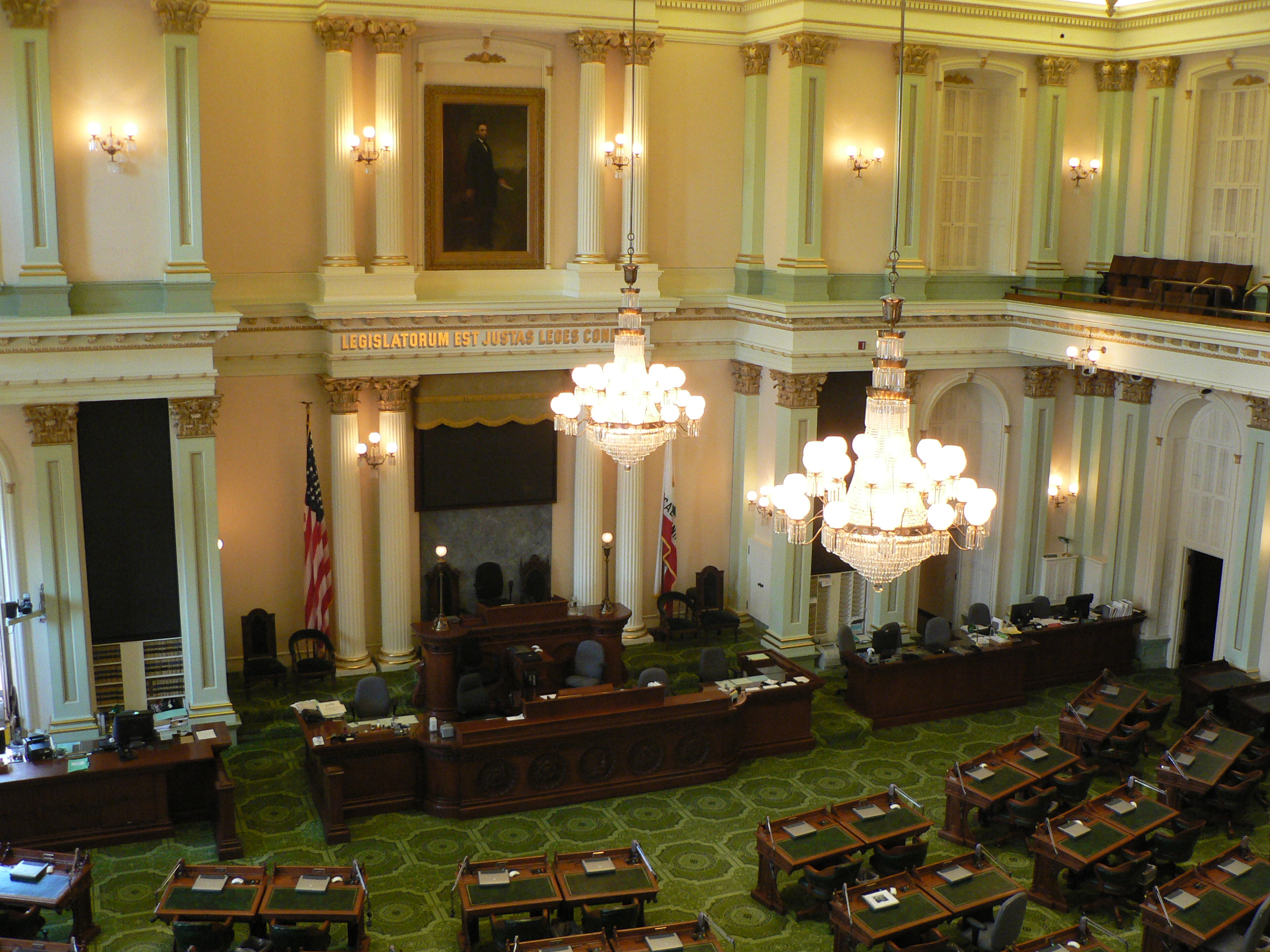
California State Assembly chamber

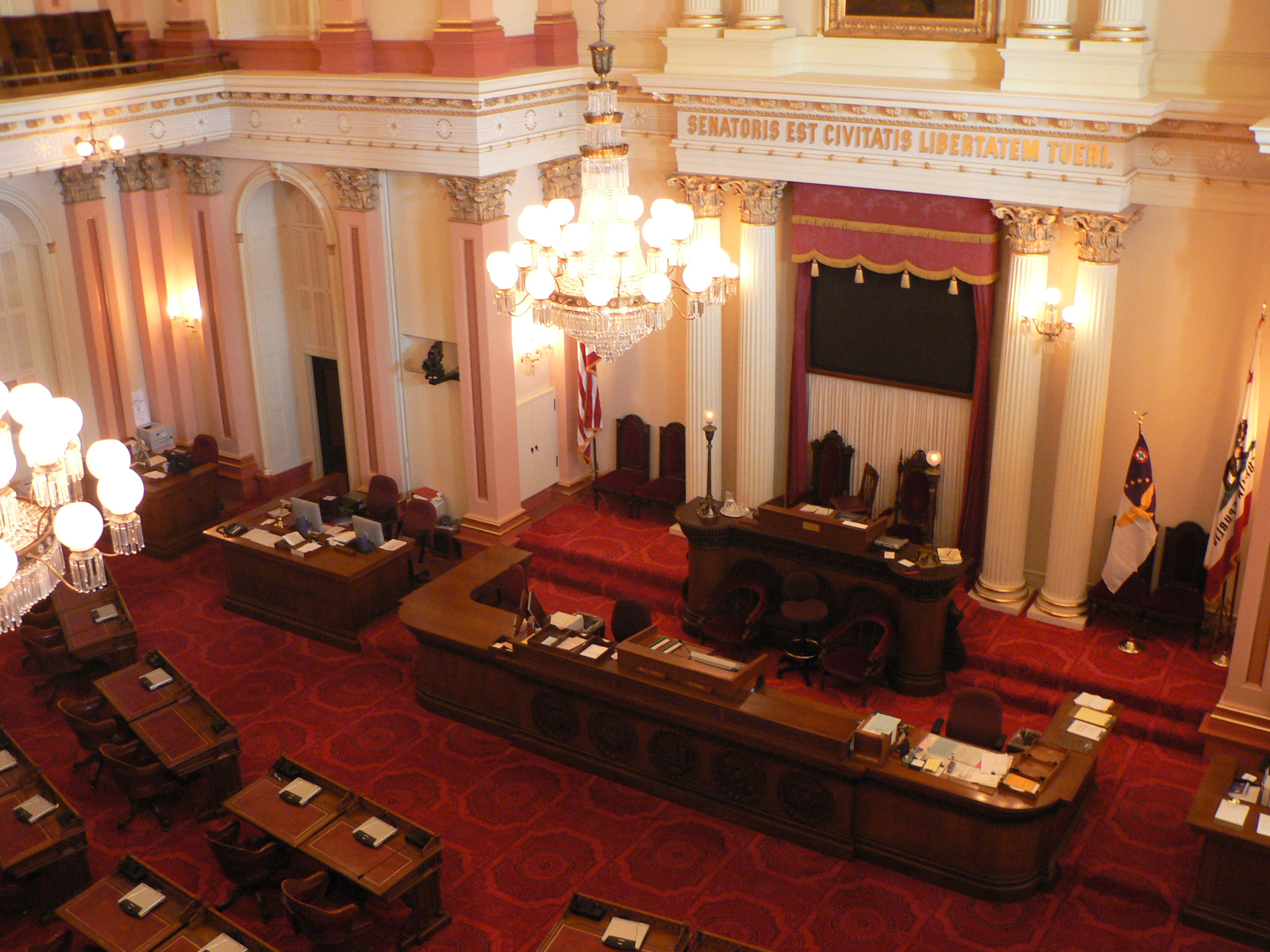
California State Senate chamber

Article IV of the 1849 California Constitution prescribed that the legislative power of the state is invested in an Assembly and a Senate which was to be designated as the Legislature of the State of California. Sessions were required to be annual and began on the first Monday of the January after the previous election unless if the governor called an extraordinary session by proclamation. The terms of Assembly members lasted for one year while the terms of Senators lasted for two years. The 1849 Constitution did not prescribe the size of either house, but it did require that the Senate was to be composed of no less than one third but no more than one half of the number of members in the Assembly, with half of the senators being up for election each year while requiring the legislature to fix the number of senators and a, with there to be no less than 24 and no more than 36 members in the Assembly until the population of the state reached 100,000 residents, upon which the number of members in the Assembly was to be no less than 36 and no more than 80. Legislative districts were to be apportioned among the "several counties and districts" according to the white population of said areas. Section 25 imposed a single-subject rule on legislative bills, Section 26 prohibited the legislature from granting a divorce, Section 31 prohibited the legislature from establishing a corporation with a special act (similar to a private bill), Section 34 prohibited the legislature from granting a charter "for banking purposes" while Section 35 required the legislature to enact a statute which prohibited any person or corporation from "..exercising the privileges of banking or creating paper to circulate as money", and Section 38 required all votes in the legislature to be conducted via voice vote.

=== 1879 Constitution ===
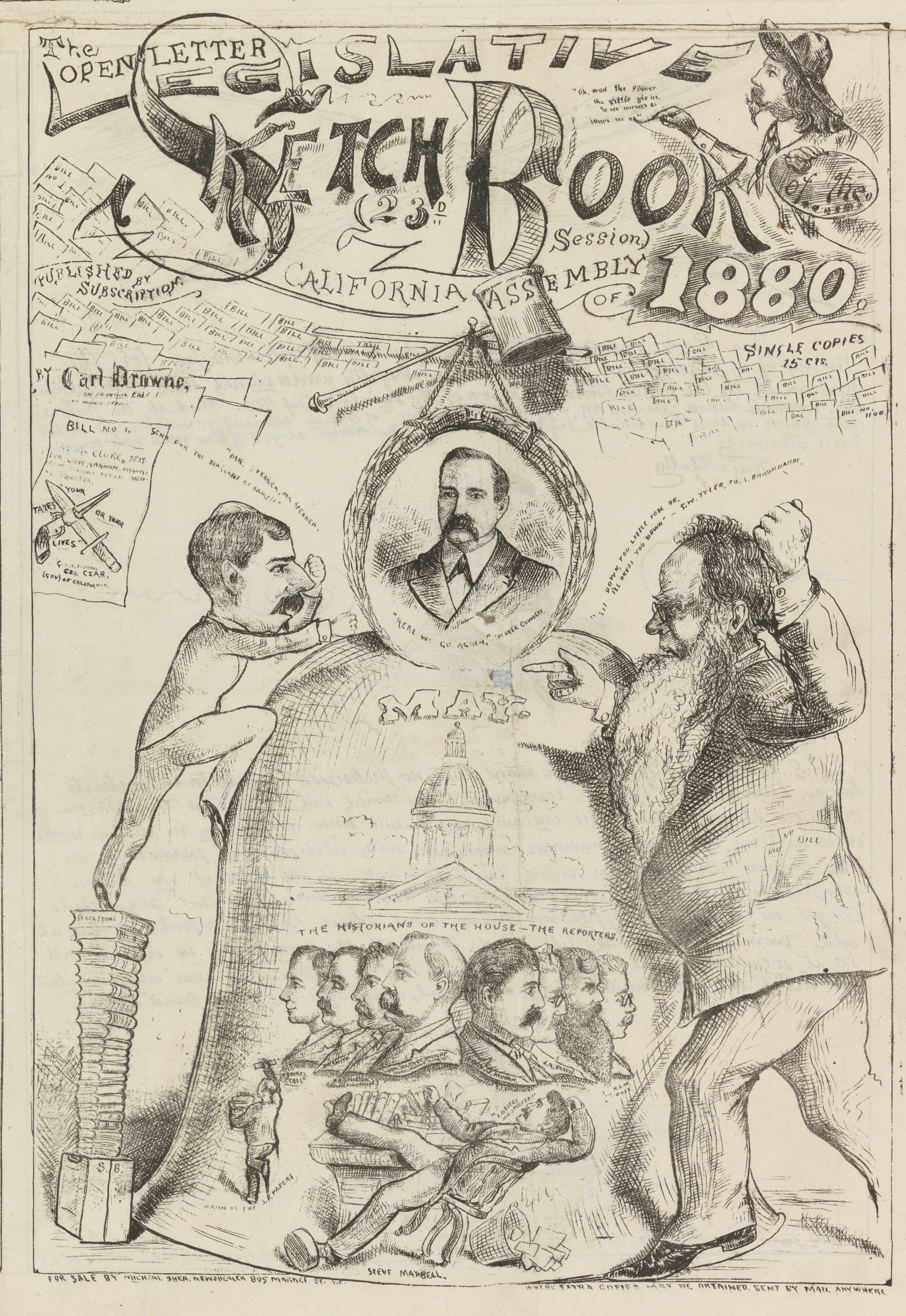
The cover of Carl Browne's Open Letter Legislative Sketch Book, 23d Session, California Assembly of 1880, featuring caricatures of assemblymen Samuel Braunhart, Jabez F. Cowdery, George W. Tyler and Stephen Maybell

In its original form, Article IV of the 1879 California Constitution structured the legislature in a similar way to the 1849 Constitution. However, the 1879 Constitution explicitly stated that the Senate has 40 members and that the Assembly has 80 members. The constitution also explicitly provides that Senators terms are four years and the terms of members of the Assembly are two years.

== Legislative session schedule ==
New legislators convene each new two-year session, to organize, in the Assembly and Senate chambers, respectively, at noon on the first Monday in December following the election.

After the organizational meeting, both houses are in recess until the first Monday in January, except when the first Monday is January 1 or January 1 is a Sunday, in which case they meet the following Wednesday. Aside from the recess, the legislature is in session year-round.

== State House ==
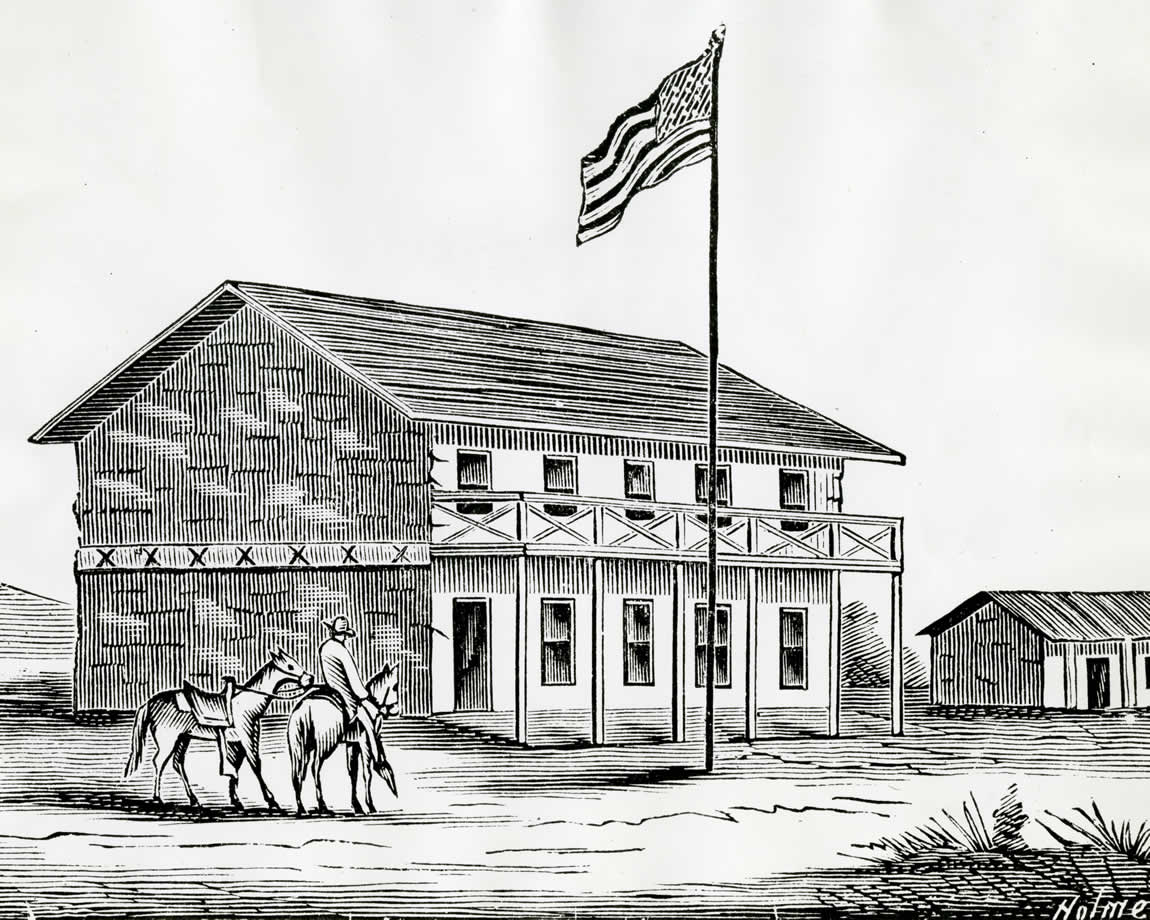
California's first capitol building in San Jose

Since California was given official statehood by the 31st United States Congress on September 9, 1850, as part of the Compromise of 1850, the state capital was variously San Jose (1850–1851), Vallejo (1852–1853) and Benicia (1853–1854), until Sacramento was finally selected in 1854.

The first Californian State House was originally a hotel in San Jose owned by businessman Pierre "Don Pedro" Sainsevain and his associates.

The State Legislature currently meets in the California State Capitol in Sacramento.

== Terms and term limits ==
Members of the Assembly are elected from 80 districts and serve two-year terms. All 80 Assembly seats are subject to election every two years. Members of the Senate are elected from 40 districts and serve four-year terms. Every two years, one half of the Senate (20 seats) is subject to election, with odd-numbered districts up for election during presidential elections, and even-numbered districts up for election during midterm elections.

Term limits were initially established in 1990 following the passage of Proposition 140. In June 2012, voters approved Proposition 28, which limits legislators to a maximum of 12 years, without regard to whether they serve those years in the State Assembly or the State Senate. Legislators first elected on or before June 5, 2012, are restricted by the previous term limits, approved in 1990, which limited legislators to three terms in the State Assembly and two terms in the State Senate.

== Record keeping ==
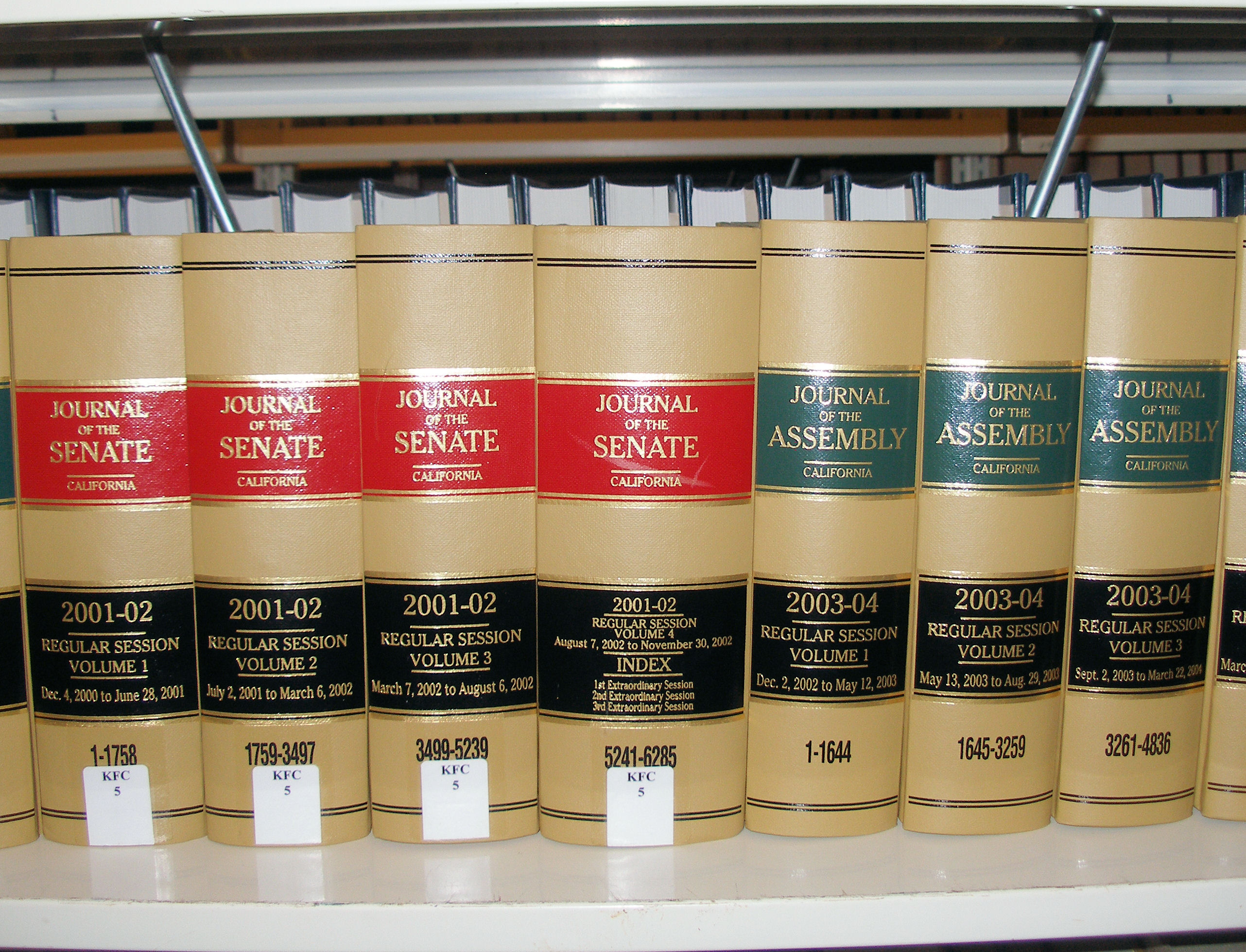
A few volumes of the journals of each house (Senate [upper chamber] is red; Assembly [lower chamber] is green.)

The proceedings of the California State Legislature are briefly summarized in regularly published journals, which show votes and who proposed or withdrew what. Reports produced by California executive agencies, as well as the Legislature, were published in the Appendices to the Journals from 1849 to 1970. Since the 1990s, the legislature has provided a live video feed for its sessions, and has been broadcast state-wide on the California Channel and local public-access television cable TV. Due to the expense and the obvious political downside, California did not keep verbatim records of actual speeches made by members of the Assembly and Senate until the video feed began. As a result, reconstructing legislative intent outside of an act's preamble is extremely difficult in California for legislation passed before the 1990s.

Since 1993, the Legislature has hosted a web or FTP site in one form or another. The current website contains the text of all statutes, all bills, the text of all versions of the bills, all the committee analyses of bills, all the votes on bills in committee or on the floor, and veto messages from the governor. Before then, committees occasionally published reports for significant bills, but most bills were not important enough to justify the expense of printing and distributing a report to archives and law libraries across the state. For bills lacking such a formal committee report, the only way to discover legislative intent is to access the state archives in Sacramento and manually review the files of relevant legislators, legislative committees, and the governor's office from the relevant time period, in the hope of finding a statement of intent and evidence that the statement actually reflected the views of several of the legislators who voted for the bill (as opposed to just one).

== Legislative committees ==
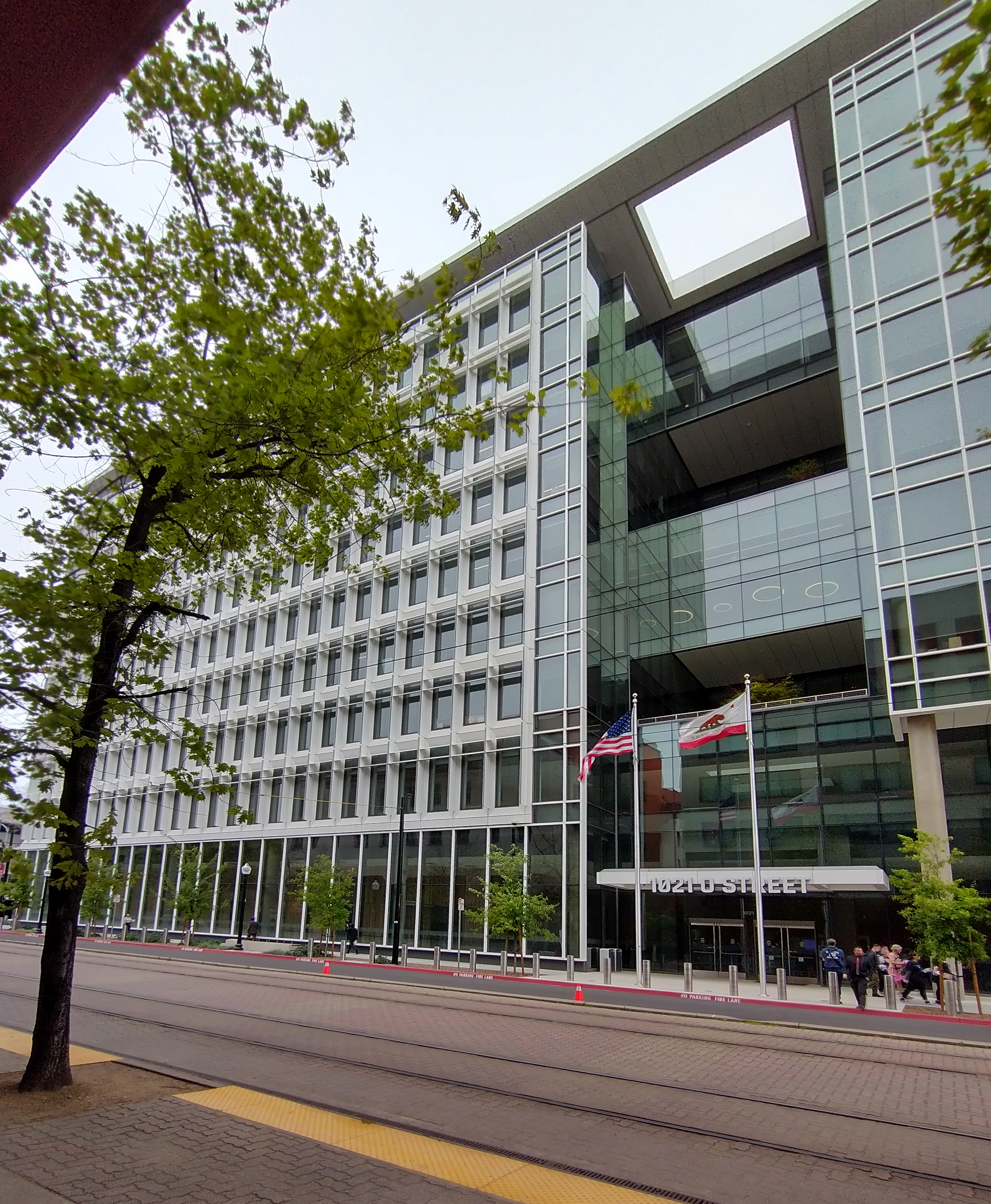
Capitol Annex Swing Space. During the replacement of the Capitol Annex, starting in 2022 Legislature offices are located at 1021 O Street two blocks from the Capitol.

The most sought-after legislative committee appointments are to governance and finance, business and professions, and health. These are sometimes called "juice" committees, because membership in these committees often aids the campaign fundraising efforts of the committee members because powerful lobbying groups want to donate to members of these committees.

=== Pocket veto ===
The legislature can "pocket veto" laws by avoiding consideration and thus avoiding a vote. The Appropriations "Suspense File", which was created in the mid-1980s, is a popular way to avoid a vote.

When a committee refuses to vote a bill out of committee, a discharge petition can typically be passed by the broader membership. In California, as of 2019 this was governed by Senate Rule 28 which requires 21 members and Assembly Rule 96(a) which requires 41 members; the procedure was notably used in 1998.

In 2019, a rule change in the Assembly allowed committee chairs to avoid considering bills, which effectively kills the proposal. A proposed amendment to the constitution (ACA-23) was proposed for the 2017–2018 session to require a vote.

Across the country, pocket veto powers are not uncommon in legislatures; in Colorado, the power was notably repealed in a citizen initiative constitutional amendment in 1988 driven by various reform groups.

== Overview of legislative procedure ==
A bill is a proposal to change, repeal, or add to existing state law. An Assembly Bill (AB) is one introduced in the Assembly; a Senate Bill (SB), in the Senate.

Bills are designated by number, in the order of introduction in each house. For example, AB 16 refers to the 16th bill introduced in the Assembly. The numbering starts afresh each session. However, budget bills are generally numbered starting with 100. There may be one or more "extraordinary" sessions. The bill numbering starts again for each of these. For example, the third bill introduced in the Assembly for the second extraordinary session is ABX2 3. The name of the author, the legislator who introduced the bill, becomes part of the title of the bill.

The legislative procedure, is divided into distinct stages:

- Drafting. The procedure begins when a senator or assemblymember decides to author a bill. A legislator sends the idea for the bill to the California Office of the Legislative Counsel, which drafts it into bill form and returns the draft to the legislator for introduction.
- Introduction or First Reading. A legislator introduces a bill for the first time by reading or having read: the bill number, name of the author, and descriptive title on the floor of the house. The bill then goes to the Office of State Publishing. The legislator can not act on a bill, except the Budget Bill, until 30 days after its introduction.
- Committee hearing. After introduction, a bill goes to the rules committee of the house, which assigns it to the policy committee appropriate to the subject matter, for its first hearing. During the committee hearing, the author presents the bill to the committee, which may hear testimony in support of or opposition to the bill. The committee then votes on whether to pass the bill out of committee, or that it be passed as amended. Bills may be amended several times. It takes a majority vote of the committee membership to pass a bill and send it to the next committee or to the floor.
- The Fiscal Committee reviews the bill if it contains an appropriation or has financial implications for the state.
- A second reading on the floor of the house happens when a bill is recommended for passage. Ordinarily there is little or no debate. If a bill is amended at this stage, it may be referred back for another committee hearing.
- Floor vote. A roll call vote is taken. An ordinary bill needs a majority vote to pass . An urgency bill or a bill with tax increases requires a two-thirds vote. The California Constitution used to require a two-thirds vote of both houses on the yearly budget and on any bill that would increase taxes, but since the passage of California Proposition 25 (2010), the two-thirds vote is required only for tax increases. Before this change, the two-thirds vote requirement was faulted for much of what had been termed "legislative gridlock", enabling a minority party to block approval of a budget before the previous one expired. (Note: The California Constitution was amended by voters in 2004 to include a balanced budget amendment that allowed the minority party to negotiate sizable budget cuts, versus revenue increases, by not providing enough votes to pass a budget if certain demands were not met. In 2009, when California faced a major revenue crisis due to the global economic downturn, the state was forced to issue revenue anticipation warrants ("RAWs", or more commonly, "IOUs") for two months because it lacked budgetary authority to issue payments. In 2010, California voters again amended the state's constitution with the approval of Proposition 25, which lets a simple majority pass an "all cuts budget" to meet the balanced budget requirement, and provide budgetary authority to issue payments and avoid revenue anticipation warrants, but continued the requirement of a two-thirds vote to increase revenues and reduce budget cuts.)
- Second house. If it receives a favorable vote in the first house, a bill repeats the same steps in the other house. If the second house passes the bill without changing it, it is sent to the governor's desk.
- Resolution of Differences (concurrence or conference). If a measure is amended in the second house and passed, it is returned to the house of origin for consideration of amendments. The house of origin may concur with the amendments and send the bill to the governor or reject the amendments and submit it to a two-house conference committee. If either house rejects the conference report, a second (and even a third) conference committee can be formed. If both houses adopt the conference report, the bill is sent to the governor.
- Governor's action. Within 30 days after receiving a bill, the governor may sign it into law, allow it to become law without his/her signature, or veto it.
- Overrides. A vetoed bill is returned to the house of origin, where a vote may be taken to override the governor's veto; a two-thirds vote of both houses is required to override a veto. (There has been no override in the California Legislature since 1979.)
- California Law and effective date. Each bill that is passed by the Legislature and approved by the governor is assigned a chapter number by the secretary of state. These chaptered bills are statutes, and ordinarily become part of the California Codes. Ordinarily a law passed during a regular session takes effect January 1 of the following year. A few statutes go into effect as soon as the governor signs them; these include acts calling for elections and urgency measures necessary for the immediate preservation of the public peace, health, or safety.

== Compensation ==
From December 4, 2023, members of the California State Legislature receive an annual salary of $128,215. The Assembly speaker, Senate president pro tempore, and minority floor leaders receive salaries of $147,446. Majority floor leaders and second ranking minority leaders receive salaries of $137,832. As of 2023, California legislators are paid the second highest salary of any state. Senators receive per diem of $211 and Assembly members receive per diem of $214.

== Reform proposals ==
=== Expansion proposals ===
The Neighborhood Legislature Reform Act

On July 23, 2015, then former Republican presidential primary candidate John Cox submitted a ballot measure named "The Neighborhood Legislature Reform Act" which proposed that the Legislature's districts be subdivided into "neighborhood districts" of approximately 5000 people within each Assembly district and 10000 people within each Senate district. The representatives of these "neighborhood districts" within each district would then elect 40 Senate members and 80 Assembly members by majority vote. It has been argued that while this proposal would make it easier for citizens to get the attention of any individual community representative, it would also in turn make it harder for these representatives to get the attention of their state legislators. The measure failed to acquire enough signatures to qualify as a proposition for the 2016 November elections ballot. As it is, the Assembly and the Senate are small compared to the legislatures of other states and the United States Legislature. Each member of the Assembly represents approximately 500,000 persons (40 million divided by 80), and each member of the Senate represents approximately 1,000,000 persons (40 million divided by 40). By way of comparison, members of the United States House of Representatives represent an average of 761,000 persons.

== See also ==
- California Statutes
- Government of California
- List of California state legislatures

=== Districts, elections and members ===
- California State Assembly Districts
- California State Senate Districts
- Districts in California
- Members of the California State Legislature

=== Legislative caucuses ===
- California Legislative Progressive Caucus
- California Legislative LGBTQ Caucus
- California Legislative Black Caucus
