= Time constraint =

In law, time constraints are placed on certain actions and filings in the interest of speedy justice, and additionally to prevent the evasion of the ends of justice by waiting until a matter is moot. The penalty for violating a legislative or court-imposed time constraint may be anything from a small fine to judicial determination of an entire case against one's interests.

For example, if a complaining party files an action and then fails to cause the papers pertaining thereto to be served on the opposing party within the time established by local rules, and is unable to convince the court that there was good and sufficient reason for the delay, he risks having his action dismissed with prejudice. If the opposing party is served with the papers and fails to respond within the time limit provided for his answer, he risks having the case decided against him by default.

If one is aggrieved by the judicial outcome of an action and wishes to appeal, he may be forever barred from doing so if he fails to meet the deadline by which his appeal may be filed.

By court order, or by local rule, there may be other time constraints. One may be required to answer interrogatories or a request to produce or other discovery pleadings within a given time. He may be required to give a certain number of days' advance notice before he intends to depose a party or witness. A court may order that there will be only a certain number of weeks or months allowed during which the parties to an action may conduct discovery. There may be a limitation placed upon a deposition, requiring that the party taking it conclude his questioning within a certain number of hours or days.

== See also ==
- Statute of limitations
- Statute of repose
