= Inspection of documents =

In pre-trial discovery during a lawsuit, parties may have the right to inspect documents that are relevant to the case.

In civil cases, the concept of "documents" has been interpreted broadly, and it generally includes any item that contains descriptive information, including electronic records.

== History ==
Traditionally, in the English common law system, parties who filed lawsuits that requested legal remedies could file a request in the Court of Chancery to inspect of documents in the possession of an opposing party, as long as the documents "tended to prove 'the case' at law of the party filing the [request]." If the documents were not privileged, the court would order the opposing party to provide the requested documents to a clerk in the Court of Chancery so that duplicates could be made. These documents could then later be used as evidence at trial.

== Procedure ==
In many jurisdictions, parties who wish to inspect documents must deliver a formal request for inspection to the parties that possess those documents. These requests usually must describe the documents that would be inspected. Once the request has been delivered to the party in possession of the documents, that party generally must allow for inspection or respond with objections within a specified period of time. Some jurisdictions allow parties in the case to inspect documents that are in the possession of individuals or organizations that are not a party in the case. In general, courts have discretion to compel parties to disclose documents, and courts may also limit a party's right to access or inspect documents. In England, for example, when determining whether a party should be allowed to inspect documents, courts balance the party's need for that evidence against any public interests that would be protected by denying the request for inspection. Courts may also impose sanctions on parties that do not comply with requests for inspection.

== See also ==
- Interrogatories
- Request for admissions
- Subpoena duces tecum
