= Summary judgment =

Court judgment without a full trial

In law, a summary judgment, also referred to as judgment as a matter of law or summary disposition, is a judgment entered by a court for one party and against another party summarily, i.e., without a full trial. Summary judgments may be issued on the merits of an entire case, or on discrete issues in that case. The formulation of the summary judgment standard is stated in somewhat different ways by courts in different jurisdictions. In the United States, the presiding judge generally must find there is "no genuine dispute as to any material fact and the movant is entitled to judgment as a matter of law." In England and Wales, the court rules for a party without a full trial when "the claim, defence or issue has no real prospect of success and there is no other compelling reason why the case or issue should be disposed of at a trial."

== Purpose and rationale ==
In common-law systems, questions about what the law actually is in a particular case are decided by judges; in rare cases jury nullification of the law may act to contravene or complement the instructions or orders of the judge, or other officers of the court. A factfinder has to decide what the facts are and apply the law. In traditional common law the factfinder was a jury, but in many jurisdictions the judge now acts as the factfinder as well. It is the factfinder who decides "what really happened", and it is the judge who applies the law to the facts as determined by the factfinder, whether directly or by giving instructions to the jury. In the absence of an award of summary judgment (or some type of pretrial dismissal), a lawsuit ordinarily proceeds to trial, which is an opportunity for litigants to contest evidence in an attempt to persuade the factfinder that they are saying "what really happened", and that, under the applicable law, they should prevail. The necessary steps before a case can get to trial include disclosing documents to the opponent by discovery, showing the other side the evidence, often in the form of witness statements. This process is lengthy, and can be difficult and costly.

A party moving (applying) for summary judgment is attempting to avoid the time and expense of a trial when, in the moving party's view, the outcome is obvious. Typically this is stated as, when all the evidence likely to be put forward is such that no reasonable factfinder could disagree with the moving party, summary judgment is appropriate. Sometimes this will occur when there is no real dispute as to what happened, but it also frequently occurs when there is a nominal dispute but the non-moving party cannot produce enough evidence to support its position. A party may also move for summary judgment in order to eliminate the risk of losing at trial, and possibly avoid having to go through discovery (i.e., by moving at the outset of discovery), by demonstrating to the judge, via sworn statements and documentary evidence, that there are no material factual issues remaining to be tried. If there is nothing for the factfinder to decide, then the moving party asks rhetorically, why have a trial? The moving party will also attempt to persuade the court that the undisputed material facts require judgment to be entered in its favor. In many jurisdictions, a party moving for summary judgment takes the risk that, although the judge may agree there are no material issues of fact remaining for trial, the judge may also find that it is the non-moving party that is entitled to judgment as a matter of law.

== Specific jurisdictions ==
=== United States ===
In the United States federal courts, summary judgment is governed by Federal Rule 56 of the Federal Rules of Civil Procedure, derived primarily from the three seminal cases concerning summary judgment out of the 1980s. See Federal Rules of Civil Procedure 56; Celotex Corp. v. Catrett, 477 U.S. 317, 322–27 (1986) (clarifying the shifting allocations of burdens of production, persuasion, and proof at summary judgment); Anderson v. Liberty Lobby, Inc., 477 U.S. 242, 257 (1986) (applying heightened evidentiary standard of proof in libel action to judicial assessment of propriety of summary judgment); Matsushita Elec. Industrial Co. v. Zenith Radio Corp., 475 U.S. 574, 596–98 (1986) (holding antitrust plaintiff with an inherently implausible claim was subject to dismissal at summary judgment).

In American legal practice, summary judgment can be awarded by the court before trial, effectively holding that no trial will be necessary. At the federal level, a summary-judgment motion in United States District Court is governed by Rule 56 of the Federal Rules of Civil Procedure. Other pretrial motions, such as a "motion for judgment on the pleadings" or a "motion to dismiss for failure to state a claim upon which relief may be granted", can be converted by the judge to summary-judgment motions if matters outside the pleadings are presented to – and not excluded by – the trial-court judge.

A party seeking summary judgment (or making any other motion) is called the movant (usually, this is defendant); the opposing party is the nonmovant (usually, plaintiff). Per Rule 56(a), issuance of summary judgment can be based only upon the court's finding that, both:

1. there exists no disputed, genuine issue of material fact between the parties requiring a trial to resolve; and
2. in applying the law to the (undisputed) facts, one party is clearly entitled by law to judgment.

Here:

- An issue of (purported) fact is a (potential) event that the factfinder at trial (jury, or judge in the case of a bench trial) is charged with crediting (determining what "really happened", according to the credibility of the witnesses/experts/etc. at trial).
- A disputed issue/fact means movant claims one thing, while nonmovant makes a different (conflicting/contradictory) claim.
- A genuine issue/fact is one that can be resolved in favor of either party, by some rational/reasonable factfinder.
- A material issue/fact is one that has the potential of affecting the outcome of the case/issue in dispute (judgment in favor of one party over the other).

Of cardinal importance here is that, by design, the judge had no discretion at summary judgment time: all fact-finding is done by the jury at trial, not by the judge at summary judgment (the judge only looks for the existence of disputed facts to be found).

Summary judgment in the United States applies only in civil cases. It does not apply to criminal cases to obtain a pretrial judgment of conviction or acquittal, in part because a criminal defendant has a constitutional right to a jury trial. Some federal and state-court judges publish general guidelines and sample summary judgment forms.

According to Federal Judicial Center research, summary-judgment motions are filed in 17% of federal cases. 71% of summary-judgment motions were filed by defendants, 26% by plaintiffs. Out of these, 36% of the motions were denied, and 64% were granted in whole or in part.

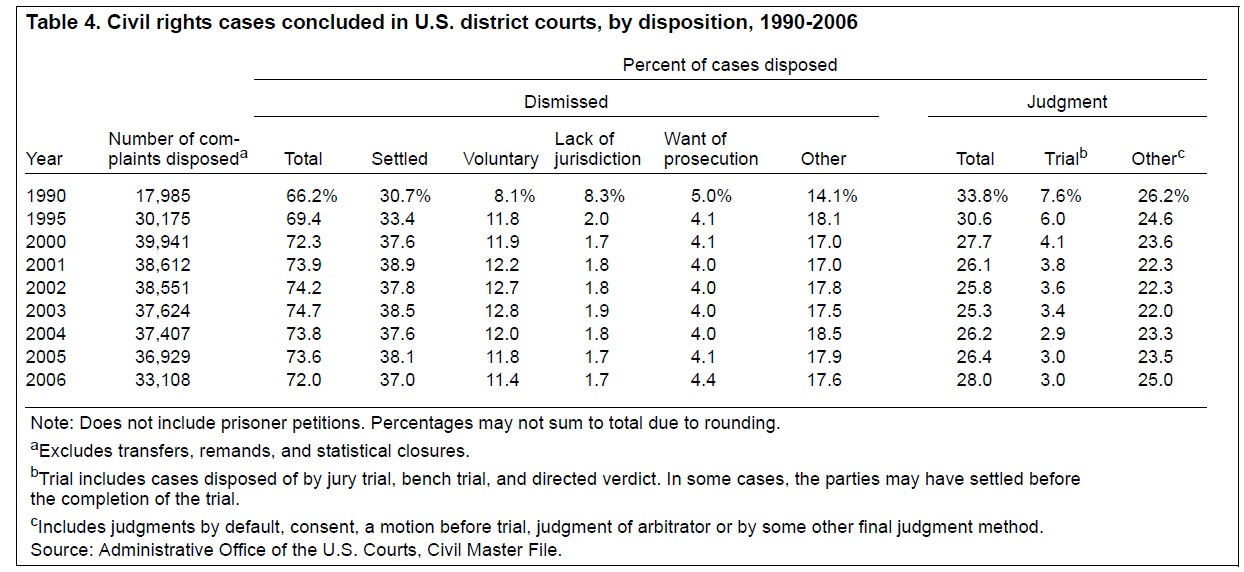
Civil rights cases concluded in U.S. district courts, by disposition, 1990–2006.

From a tactical perspective, there are two basic types of summary-judgment motions. One requires a full evidentiary presentation, and the other requires only a more limited, targeted one.

First, a plaintiff may seek summary judgment on any cause of action, and similarly, a defendant may seek summary judgment in its favor on any affirmative defense. But in either case, the moving party must produce evidence in support of each and every essential element of the claim or defense (as it would have to do at trial). To be successful, this type of summary-judgment motion must be drafted as a written preview of a party's entire case-in-chief (that it would put before the finder of fact at trial) because all parts of an entire claim or defense are at issue.

Second, a different and very common tactic is where a defendant seeks summary judgment on a plaintiff's cause of action. The key difference is that in this latter situation, the defendant need only attack one essential element of the plaintiff's claim. A finding that the plaintiff cannot prove one essential element of its claim necessarily renders all other elements immaterial and results in summary judgment for the defendant. So these motions tend to be precisely targeted to the weakest points of the plaintiff's case. It is also possible for a plaintiff to seek summary judgment on a defendant's affirmative defense, but those types of motions are very rare.

A party seeking summary judgment may refer to any evidence that would be admissible at trial, such as depositions (or deposition excerpts), party admissions, affidavits in support from witnesses, documents received during discovery (such as contracts, emails, letters, and certified government documents). The pieces of evidence should be accompanied by a declaration from the moving party that all copies of the documents are true and correct, including deposition excerpts. Each party may present to the court its view of applicable law by submitting a legal memorandum supporting, or opposing, the motion. The opposing party may also file its own summary-judgment motion (called a cross-motion), if the deadline still allows. The court may allow for oral argument of the lawyers, generally where the judge wishes to question the lawyers on issues in the case.

Deadline for filing of the dispositive motions in U.S. federal court system is set by judge in the initial discovery plan order. If a party wants to file a motion or a cross-motion for summary judgment after the deadline, it needs to ask for leave of court. Normally, federal judges require valid reasons to alter case-management deadlines and only do so with reluctance.

There are also freely accessible web search engines to assist parties in finding court decisions that can be cited as an example or analogy to resolve similar questions of law. Google Scholar is the biggest database of full-text state and federal court decisions that can be accessed without charge. These web search engines often allow one to select specific state courts to search. Summary judgment is awarded if the undisputed facts and the law make it clear that it would be impossible for one party to prevail if the matter were to proceed to trial. The court must consider all designated evidence in the light most favorable to the party opposing the summary judgment motion.

If a trial could result in the jury (or judge in a bench trial) deciding in favor of the party opposing the motion, then summary judgment is inappropriate. A decision granting summary judgment can be appealed without delay. A decision denying summary judgment ordinarily cannot be immediately appealed; instead, the case continues on its normal course. In United States federal courts, a denial of summary judgment cannot be appealed until final resolution of the whole case, because of the requirements of 28 U.S.C. § 1291 and 28 U.S.C. § 1292 (the final judgment rule).

To defeat a summary-judgment motion, the non-moving party only has to show substantial evidence that a dispute of material facts exists, regardless of the strength of that evidence. For example, even if the moving side can produce the testimony of "a dozen bishops", and the non-moving side only has the testimony of a known liar, then summary judgment is not appropriate. Deciding on the relative credibility of witnesses is a question for the factfinder at trial.

Where appropriate, a court may award judgment summarily upon fewer than all claims. This is known as partial summary judgment.

==== Reviews of summary judgments ====
It is not uncommon for summary judgments of the lower U.S. courts in complex cases to be overturned on appeal. A grant of summary judgment is reviewed de novo, meaning, without deference to the views of the trial judge, both as to the determination that there is no remaining genuine issue of material fact and that the prevailing party was entitled to judgment as a matter of law.

==== State-court practice ====
Summary judgment practice in state courts in most U.S. states is similar to federal practice, though with minor differences. For example, the U.S. state of California requires the moving party to actually present evidence rather than merely refer to evidence. This is done by attaching relevant documents and by summarizing all relevant factual points within those documents in a separate statement of facts. In turn, the record to be reviewed by the judge can be very large; for example, the landmark Aguilar case involved a record of about 18,400 pages. Also, California uses the term "summary adjudication" instead of "partial summary judgment". The California view is that the latter term is an oxymoron since a judgment is defined by California Code of Civil Procedure Section 577 as the "final determination of the rights of the parties" and a "partial summary judgment" is not actually final since it necessarily leaves some issues to be decided at trial. There is currently a conflict between the different districts of the California Courts of Appeal as to the availability of summary adjudication; most superior courts tend to side with the narrowest interpretation of California Code of Civil Procedure section 437c, under which a party may make such a motion only with respect to an entire cause of action, an affirmative defense, or a punitive-damages claim. There is also language in section 437c about "issues of duty", but some Court of Appeal panels have given that phrase an extremely narrow interpretation due to evidence that the California State Legislature has been trying to stop the state courts from engaging in the piecemeal adjudication of individual issues.

In New York, there is the procedure of summary judgment in lieu of complaint CPLR § 3213. This allows a plaintiff in an action based on an instrument to pay money only or a judgment to file a motion for summary judgment and supporting papers with the summons instead of a complaint. The motion must be noted to be heard on the date the defendant is required to appear under CPLR 320(a). If the plaintiff sets down the hearing date later than the minimum, he may require the defendant to serve a copy of the answering paper on him within the extended period. If the motion is denied the moving and answering papers shall be deemed the complaint and answer, respectively, unless the court orders otherwise.

==== Filing and privacy ====
Many U.S. district courts have developed their own requirements included in local rules for filing summary-judgment motions. Local rules can set limits on the number of pages, explain if a separate factual statement is required, whether it is acceptable to combine motion petition with a response, and if a judge needs an additional copy of the documents (called a judge's copy), etc. Local rules can define page-layout elements like margins, text font/size, distance between lines, mandatory footer text, page numbering, and provide directions on how the pages need to be bound together – i.e., acceptable fasteners, number and location of fastening holes, etc. If the filed motion does not comply with the local rules, then the judge can choose to strike the motion completely, or order the party to re-file its motion, or grant a special exception to the local rules.

Summary-judgment motions, like many other court filings, are a matter of public record. So under Federal Rules of Civil Procedure 5.2, sensitive text like Social Security number, Taxpayer Identification Number, birthday, bank accounts and children's names, should be redacted from the summary-judgment motion and accompanying exhibits. The redacted text can be erased with black-out or white-out, and the page should have an indication that it was redacted – most often by stamping the word "redacted" on the bottom. Alternately, the filing party may ask the court's permission to file some exhibits completely under seal. A minor's name of the petitions should be replaced with initials.

However, certain types of filings containing information that would otherwise be redacted are excepted from redaction. Additionally, the local rules may require parties seeking to seal documents to first file a motion to seal and obtain leave of the court prior to filing the sealed documents.

A person making a redacted filing can file an unredacted copy under seal, or the court can choose to order later that an additional filing be made under seal without redaction. Copies of both redacted and unredacted documents filed with the court should be provided to the other parties in the case.

==== Criminal law counterpart ====
In the United States, the criminal law counterpart to summary judgment is the motion to dismiss.

=== England and Wales ===
In England and Wales, Part 24 of the Civil Procedure Rules governs the award of summary judgment. Summary judgment is available in all claims against both the defendant and claimant with the following exceptions.

- There may be no summary judgment in possession proceedings against a mortgagor or a person holding over after the end of his tenancy whose occupancy is protected within the meaning of the Rent Act 1977 or the Housing Act 1988.
- There may be no summary judgment against a defendant in admiralty proceedings in rem.

=== Canada ===
Summary judgment procedures were broadened in Canadian courts in the 1980s. With the exception of Quebec (which has its own procedural device for disposing of abusive claims summarily), all provinces feature a summary judgment mechanism in their respective rules of civil procedure. Ontario, after a study on the issues of access to justice, reformed its rules in 2010 to extend the powers of motion judges and masters for ordering summary judgment, following the introduction of similar measures in Alberta and British Columbia.

In 2014, the Supreme Court of Canada encouraged greater use of the procedure by the courts in its ruling in Hryniak v. Mauldin. In this case, the Supreme Court of Canada announced a cultural shift, in favor of greater reliance on summary judgment motions to adjudicate disputes, as opposed to reliance on conventional trial. This shift was urged by a desire to increase access to civil justice, by interpreting summary judgment rules broadly, "favoring proportionality and fair access to the affordable, timely and just adjudication of claims".

However, since the decision in Hyniak, a number of court decisions have sought to limit its use in the context of motions for partial summary judgments. In Butera v. Chown, Cairns LLP, the Ontario Court of Appeal reports "the increase in summary judgment motions that have flowed since Hryniak" and that judges "are required to spend time hearing partial summary judgment motions and writing comprehensive reasons on an issue that does not dispose of the action."

=== Turkey ===
Summary judgments are not permitted under Turkish law.

=== Germany ===
There is no specific provision in German law for summary judgment, though a judge may dismiss a clearly unfounded case on the merits after a hearing and without receiving evidence into the record.

=== Hong Kong ===
Summary judgment exists in Hong Kong. The test is whether there is a triable issue and if there is one, whether it amounts to an arguable defense.

== See also ==
- Dispositive motion
