= Initial conference =

An initial conference is one of the first steps of the discovery process in a civil case. In the U.S. federal court system, initial conferences are governed by Rule 26 of the Federal Rules of Civil Procedure.

== Rule 26 conference ==
According to the FRCP, the plaintiff must initiate a conference between the parties to plan for the discovery process after the complaint was served to the defendants. The parties must confer as soon as practicable after the complaint was served to the defendants — and in any event at least 21 days before a scheduling conference is to be held or a scheduling order is due under Rule 16(b). The parties should attempt to agree on the proposed discovery plan, and submit it to the court within 14 days after the conference.

== Conference discussion topics ==
=== Discovery plan ===
The discovery plan must state the parties' proposals on subject of discovery, limitations on discovery, case management schedule and timing deadlines for each stage of discovery processes, including:

- End-date of the discovery. This should be at least 60 days before the trial. The trial target date is usually six months to two years after the conference.
- Amendments to the deadlines for filing pleadings under FRCP 7&15, if any.
- Deadline for amending pleadings. Normally it is at least 30 days before the discovery ends.
- Deadline for joining claims, remedies and parties (FRCP 18&19). Normally it is at least 30 days before the discovery ends.
- Deadline for initial expert disclosures and rebuttal expert disclosures. Normally it is at least 30 days before the discovery ends.
- Deadline for dispositive motions. Usually it is at least 30 days after the discovery end-date.
- Deadline for pre-trial order. If any dispositive motions are filed, the Pretrial Order can be filed at least 30 days after the last decision on the merits.

=== Initial disclosures ===
Unless all parties agree otherwise, the parties should submit to each other the Initial Disclosures under Rule 26(a) within 14 days after the conference. At minimum, the Initial Disclosures should list:

- People that may have discoverable information, their addresses and the subjects of information (including names of the opposite party).
- Description by category and location of documents that the disclosing party may use to support its claims or defenses. The actual copies of the documents can be either attached with the Initial Disclosures, or more frequently provided later on the opposite party's request.
- Computation of each category of damages claimed by the disclosing party.
- Any insurance agreement under which an insurance business may be liable to satisfy all or part of a possible judgment.

Only after the initial disclosures have been sent, the main discovery process begins, which includes: depositions, interrogatories, request for admissions (RFA) and request for production of documents(RFP). Parties must supplement their Initial Disclosures each time when they discover new witnesses or documents that they want to use in court to support their claims or defenses.
