= Suggestion of death =

A suggestion of death, in law, refers to calling the death of a party to the attention of a court and making it a matter of record, as a step in the revival of an action abated by the death of a party.

In the Federal Rules of Civil Procedure, it is governed by Fed. R. Civ. P. 25(a); it may be effected using Model Form 9.
