= Advisory jury =

An advisory jury is a group installed by a judge to give him or her an opinion during a trial. Unlike the normal jury, the advisory jury opinion is non-binding, and the judge remains the "final arbitrator of fact and law". In United States Federal Court, a case may be tried by advisory jury in the case of "an action not triable of right by a jury". When a case in federal district court is tried with an advisory jury the court must find the facts specially and state its conclusions of law separately.

== History ==
The use of an advisory jury is derived from the practice of the Court of Chancery of referring issues of fact to one of the Common Law Courts of Westminster be tried by a jury as a feigned issue. The feigned issue was to inform the conscience of the court, and could be disregarded by the Chancellor. The feigned issue was a legal fiction by stating that a wager contract was laid between two parties interested in respectively maintaining the affirmative and the negative of certain propositions. The Gaming Act 1845 section 19 abolished the feigned issue and provided that the issue should the directly state the question of fact in dispute instead of a wager. The same abolition occurred in New York by section 72 of the Field Code in 1850.

In Watt v Starke 101 U.S. 247 (1879) the United States Supreme Court stated "the verdict of a jury upon an issue out of chancery is only advisory." Federal Equity Rule 23, effective 1913, provides in an equity case when a question arises that is triable by jury, a jury trial is held on the equity side without transfer to the law side of the United States District Court. In 1938 Federal Rule of Civil Procedure 39(c)(1) established that in any action not triable of right by a jury the court on motion or on its own may have any issue tried by an advisory jury.
