= Order to show cause =

Court order

An order to show cause is a court order that requires one or more of the parties to a case to justify, explain, or prove something to the court. It describes an alleged offence and requests that the recipient provides an explanation.

== United States ==
In the United States, courts commonly use orders to show cause when the judge needs more information before deciding whether or not to issue an order requested by one of the parties. For example, if a party requests that the court find another party in contempt of an existing court order, the judge will typically issue an "Order to Show Cause Re Contempt" to the party accused of being in contempt of court. At the hearing on the order to show cause concerning contempt the judge will take evidence from both sides concerning the alleged failure to comply with the court order. Appellate courts often issue orders to show cause to lower courts requesting that the lower court explain why the appellant should not be granted the relief requested by the writ or appeal. An order to show cause is always an interim order (because it is never the first nor the final action in a legal action).

In removal proceedings under the Immigration and Nationality Act, the term "Order to Show Cause" (OTSC) was replaced by "Notice to Appear" (NTA) as of April 1997.

In some jurisdictions, such as New York, an "order to show cause" is used routinely to initiate a motion when a traditional "notice of motion" would not be sufficient – for example, when the moving party wishes to vary the usual schedule for considering a motion, or when a temporary restraining order or other provisional remedy is being sought. By presenting an order to show cause with supporting papers, the moving party has the opportunity to obtain the judge's input at the outset of the motion, rather than waiting until all the moving, answering, and reply papers are fully submitted. The use of an order to show cause instead of a notice of motion does not affect the parties' burden of proof on the underlying motion.

== Australia ==
A show cause notice describes an alleged offence in detail, requesting that the recipient provides an explanation.

In Australia, show cause notices may be used in a variety of situations, such as:

- Workplace disciplinary processes
- Regulatory compliance matters
- Legal proceedings
- Professional licensing and accreditation
- Breach of contract
- Violation of rules and regulations
- Any offence that requires an explanation

== See also ==
- Summons
- Injunction
- Gag order
- Good cause
