= Lone Pine order =

United States procedural mechanism

In United States tort law, a Lone Pine order is a pre-trial case management order of the court in civil mass tort, toxic tort, and products liability cases, directing plaintiffs to show prima facie evidence of injury, exposure, and causation by a date certain or face dismissal of the case.

== Background ==
The term takes its name from a 1986 decision in a 1985 New Jersey Superior Court case, Lore v. Lone Pine Corp. (Docket No. L-33606-85, 1986 WL 637507, 1986 N.J. Super. LEXIS 1626), in which plaintiffs sought compensation for damage allegedly caused by polluted water from a landfill. Frustrated by delays in the case, including the fact that few of the 464 named defendants had been served with the lawsuit, and presented by defense lawyers with a United States Environmental Protection Agency report seemingly contradicting plaintiffs' claims, Judge William T. Wichmann of the Superior Court issued an order requiring documentation of "facts of each individual plaintiff's exposure to alleged toxic substances at or from Lone Pine Landfill" and "reports of treating physicians and medical or other experts, supporting each individual plaintiff’s claim of injury and causation by substances from Lone Pine Landfill" by June 1, 1986. Id. Finding plaintiffs' documentation to be "so inadequate as to be deemed unbelievable and unreal," and the tactics of plaintiffs' attorneys to be dilatory, Judge Wichmann dismissed the case with prejudice on November 18, 1986. Lone Pine, decision at pp. 6 and 9-10.

== Current usage ==
Since the Lone Pine case, the concept of requiring mass tort plaintiffs to show prima facie evidence early in a case has become widely used in U.S. federal and state cases to isolate spurious claims. Although there is no direct authority for such orders found in the Federal Rules of Civil Procedure or the Federal Rules of Evidence, there is "strong consensus" that they are permissible under a trial court's inherent discretionary powers. Lone Pine orders differ from other methods of discovery in that:

- they are ordered at the discretion of the court, rather than being required under formal court rules;
- they are more expensive for plaintiffs to comply with, in part because they may demand an expert's report rather than merely a plaintiff's affidavit;
- they demand evidence of specific causation rather than merely proximate cause.

According to the Lone Pine Order Database at Stanford Law School, there have been over 100 Lone Pine orders issued in federal and state cases between 1989 and 2019.
