= Terminating sanctions =

Legal procedure available to a judge

Terminating sanctions (also referred to as "case terminating sanctions") are a legal procedure by which a judge may dispose of a party's case (by dismissal or default judgment) for certain misconduct by the party or the party's attorney. Often imposed in the discovery phase of a case, this action is considered an extreme and unusual step that is reserved for egregious or repeated misbehavior before the court. Other situations in which a judge might impose terminating sanctions include a party's destruction of evidence or repeated bad faith litigation tactics.

== Examples in US law ==
California Civil Code, Code of Civil Procedure § 2023.030 provides that a court "may impose a terminating sanction" in certain situations related to discovery in civil cases. The court may strike a pleading (or a portion of a pleading), stay the case, dismiss the case, or enter a default judgment against a party that engages in misuse of the discovery process.

In federal courts, discovery sanctions are governed by Rule 37 of the Federal Rules of Civil Procedure. Although the phrase "terminating sanctions" is not used, the potential actions a judge may take under Rule 37(b)(2)(A)(iii)-(vi) are the same types of sanctions described above under California law (i.e., striking of pleadings, granting a stay, dismissal, or default judgment). In a case applying the standards of Rule 37, the United States Court of Appeals for the Eleventh Circuit affirmed a district court's ruling that dismissal of claims made by the Consumer Financial Protection Bureau was proper because the agency had been "engaging in dramatic abuse of the discovery process."

In addition to statutory authority, courts have the inherent power to sanction bad faith or abusive litigation tactics. In the case of Leon v. IDX Systems Corp., the Ninth Circuit Court of Appeals upheld a district court's dismissal sanction after it found that the plaintiff had "despoiled evidence by deleting 2,200 files from his [company-issued] laptop computer during the pendency of the litigation."
