= Discovery (law) =

Pretrial procedure in common law countries for obtaining evidence

Discovery, in the law of common law jurisdictions, is a phase of pretrial procedure in a lawsuit in which each party, through the law of civil procedure, can obtain evidence from other parties. This is by means of methods of discovery such as interrogatories, requests for production of documents, requests for admissions and depositions. Discovery can be obtained from nonparties using subpoenas. When a discovery request is objected to, the requesting party may seek the assistance of the court by filing a motion to compel discovery. Conversely, a party or nonparty resisting discovery can seek the assistance of the court by filing a motion for a protective order.

== History ==
Discovery evolved out of a unique feature of early equitable pleading procedure before the English Court of Chancery: among various requirements, a plaintiff's bill in equity was required to plead "positions". These were statements of evidence that the plaintiff assumed to exist in support of his pleading and which he believed lay within the knowledge of the defendant. They strongly resembled modern requests for admissions, in that the defendant was required to plead only whether they were true or false. The practice of pleading positiones in canon law (which influenced Chancery procedure) had originated with "the practice of the courts of the Italian communes in the early thirteenth century". Although canonists also looked to Roman law, positiones were unknown to the Romans.

At some point between the reign of Elizabeth I (1558–1603) and the late seventeenth century, positions were gradually replaced by interrogatories: written questions which the defendant was required to truthfully respond to under oath in his answer to the bill, based on information within his own personal knowledge as well as documents in his possession. But back then, interrogatories could only elicit admissible evidence (not the broader modern standard of "reasonably calculated to lead to the discovery of admissible evidence") and could only request evidence in support of the plaintiff's case, not either side's case (that is, they could not ask for evidence which the defendant intended to use in support of his defenses and was otherwise entirely irrelevant to the plaintiff's case). Even worse, this was purely a one-way procedure, because interrogatories could only be pleaded as part of a bill (a pleading initiating a suit in equity). A defendant who needed to obtain evidence in support of his defenses had to file a cross-bill against the plaintiff to plead his own interrogatories.

Discovery did not exist at common law, but its availability in equity attracted litigants in actions at law (legal proceedings in the common law courts). They began to file bills in equity to obtain discovery in aid of actions at law. This led to another innovation in the mid-15th century: the bill to perpetuate testimony of a potential witness. This was for witnesses whose advanced age or poor health implied they would not survive to testify at the trial of an action at law.

In this type of proceeding, the parties merely pleaded written interrogatories which were read out loud to the witness in a closed proceeding without parties or counsel present. The witness's attendance was secured by service of a subpoena ad testificandum at least 14 days before the date of the examination. In London, the examinations took place before a master or an examiner in Chancery Lane. Outside of London, the parties' attorneys were supposed to jointly stipulate to a group of lay commissioners (typically four, though only two were needed for a quorum) who could not be interested persons (i.e., parties or their lawyers) and were usually country gentlemen. Once agreed upon, the court would grant them authority to examine witnesses by way of dedimus potestatem.

The person(s) examining the witness would appoint a clerk, whom under their supervision would write down the witness's oral answers under oath in summary form on paper, as if they had been spontaneously delivered as a single continuous third-person narrative, rather than as responses given in the first person to discrete questions. In other words, the actual sequence of questions and answers was not transcribed verbatim like a modern deposition. For example, the surviving narratives of multiple witnesses to a 16 May 1643 enclosure riot in Whittlesey reveal striking similarities which imply the witnesses probably gave "yes" and "no" answers to the same set of interrogatories. In London, the witness usually signed or marked the narrative at its end (and occasionally would sign at the bottom of each page), while outside of London, the clerk engrossed the narrative on parchment (in plain English, copied the text from paper to parchment in clearly legible handwriting). Either way, the resulting document (paper in or near London, parchment outside London) was filed under seal with the court, and was not revealed or "published" (in the terminology of the time) to parties or counsel until shortly before the trial in which it was to be used. An 1899 treatise on evidence law explained the rationale for this method of examining a witness in equity: it allowed a witness "ample time" for "calm recollection" as they answered questions read by a neutral person and an opportunity to correct the record at the end before it was submitted to the court as evidence. In contrast, at trial in a common law court, the witness might be subject to "severe and rapid cross-examination" without sufficient time for reflection or deliberation, thereby causing them to "misrepresent facts, from infirmity of recollection or mistake".

This procedure for ex parte out-of-court pretrial examinations under the authority of courts of equity came to be called a "deposition". It continued to be used as an evidence preservation device in aid of actions at law, but it also became the standard method for developing the factual record to be used in courts of equity as derived from the knowledge of third-party witnesses (not merely those who were old or dying). The process of summarizing testimony in narrative form, to be relied upon by the Lord Chancellor in lieu of live testimony in open court, was a kind of factfinding process in its own right. As implied by the secret nature of the proceedings and the absence of parties and counsel, equity's factfinding process was fundamentally inquisitorial (i.e., driven by the court), and not adversarial (i.e., driven by the parties). It is generally believed that this came about because the early Chancellors and the masters who assisted them were clerics with training in Roman and canon law, and therefore had some knowledge of the inquisitorial system as it functioned in ecclesiastical courts. The secrecy was thought to be absolutely essential to prevent perjury and witness tampering; the witnesses would thereby be forced to testify from memory alone, and the parties could not use the facts disclosed in testimony to guide their discovery or litigation strategy. Consistent with these inquisitorial views, there were also prohibitions on repeat testimony and on additional testimony after publication. Rather, the witnesses would testify independently of each other before publication, then at the moment of publication, all would be revealed, and the parties would make their arguments to the Chancellor on that cold record.

One key difference, however, was that in ecclesiastical courts, the judge himself took the depositions of the witnesses (by reading to them the interrogatories submitted by the parties), and thus personally developed the factual record which the parties would then argue over at trial. To modern eyes, the most bizarre aspect of Chancery's adoption of such a labor-intensive quasi-inquisitorial procedure was that for most of its history, Chancery was a one-judge court. The Crown always attempted to operate the judiciary of England and Wales as cheaply as possible—by leaving it severely understaffed in comparison to its counterparts on the European continent—thereby leaving the chancellors no choice but to delegate factfinding procedures like the taking of depositions.

Despite these defects, English settlers brought discovery and depositions with them to the Thirteen Colonies, including the tradition of having courts of equity appoint masters to take depositions. It is this quasi-inquisitorial procedure to which the United States Congress was referring in an 1802 law providing that "in all suits in equity, it shall be in the discretion of the court, upon the request of either party, to order the testimony of the witnesses therein to be taken by depositions."

The next major development (which would remain a unique feature of American and Canadian discovery) occurred under the supervision of Chancellor James Kent of the New York Court of Chancery during the early 19th century. He was trying to respond to the obvious defect of traditional depositions: since parties could not adjust their questions on the fly, they had to propound broadly drawn interrogatories, and in turn elicited "long and complicated accounts" of the facts that were difficult for masters to summarize in writing. Therefore, Kent allowed New York masters to actively engage in oral examination of witnesses (in the sense of formulating questions in real time and narrowing their scope based on the witnesses' answers), and he also allowed parties and counsel to be present when such examinations were conducted. Kent's innovations spread into American federal practice in 1842 when the U.S. Supreme Court amended the Federal Equity Rules to allow masters in equity suits in federal courts to conduct oral examinations of witnesses.

However, with the parties and counsel now present to help guide the course of the master's oral examination of the witness, it was inevitable that counsel would insist on taking over the examination itself, and their presence meant the proceedings were no longer secret. A New York deposition from January 1839 reveals that the examiner had already lost control of the examination. The examiner was reduced to summarizing a flurry of objections and arguments exchanged between the lawyers after one of them allegedly tried to take the witness aside to get an informal preview of the witness's answers before getting them on the record. All this would have been impossible under the old deposition procedure where counsel was not present.

Major reforms enacted in New York in the late 1840s and in England in the early 1850s laid the foundation for the rise of modern discovery by imposing a clear separation between pleadings and discovery as distinct phases of procedural law. Discovery devices could now be invoked independently of the pleadings. The New York reforms went much farther, by directly merging common law and equity procedure (which would also happen in England in the early 1870s), and by expressly authorizing pretrial oral examinations of both opposing parties and third-party witnesses, the basis of the modern deposition. (Up to that point, discovery from able-bodied opposing parties was still limited to interrogatories.) In fact, the New York code of civil procedure (brought about by David Dudley Field II) went so far as to abolish written interrogatories. A major flaw, though, of the New York code of civil procedure was that it only allowed parties to seek discovery on issues on which they would have the burden of proof at trial. This caused lawyers for defendants to plead fictional defenses in answers, because they still could not directly pursue discovery into the plaintiff's claims.

In 1861, Rule 67 of the Federal Equity Rules was amended to make deposition by oral examination the regular method of taking evidence in equity in federal courts; taking witness testimony by written interrogatories was now the exception. Although depositions were still taken in front of court-appointed examiners, their role had been reduced to the preparation of summary narratives to be relied upon as evidence by the court. In 1892, Rule 67 was again amended to require the preparation of an exact transcript. Subsequent amendments in 1893 and 1912 eliminated the deposition's traditional role as an equitable factfinding device by first allowing and then requiring oral testimony in open court in trials of federal suits in equity, thereby reducing the deposition to its modern role in American civil procedure as a discovery and evidence preservation device.

In England, discovery finally became available in the common law courts by the mid-1850s, after Parliament enacted the Evidence Act 1851 and the Common Law Procedure Act 1854. The right to discovery in the common law courts was "exercised somewhat more narrowly" than in chancery, but the point was that a litigant at common law no longer needed to file a bill of discovery in chancery just to obtain any discovery. The Supreme Court of Judicature Act 1873 merged together various trial courts, including the Court of Chancery, to form what is now known as the High Court of Justice. Although discovery by then had been available at common law for almost two decades, the new court generally looked to the older and broader form of discovery in chancery as the basis of its discovery rules.

In 1938, the promulgation of the Federal Rules of Civil Procedure (FRCP) (pursuant to the Rules Enabling Act) created for the first time a comprehensive discovery system in U.S. federal courts. The FRCP authorized broad discovery into "any matter, not privileged, which is relevant to the subject matter in the pending action, whether relating to the claim or defense of" either party. Due to the influence of progressive law professor Edson R. Sunderland, an enthusiastic proponent of broad discovery, the FRCP expressly authorized the complete family of discovery methods familiar to American litigators today. What made the FRCP so revolutionary was that although many state governments had regularly allowed one or more methods of discovery, no one state nor the federal government had ever attempted to allow litigators to use all of them, as Sunderland frankly admitted to the Advisory Committee that drafted the FRCP. As a result, the United States has the broadest discovery system in the world.

After American discovery became the subject of harsh criticism for many decades (as separately summarized below), the United States retreated somewhat from broad discovery in the federal courts by expressly incorporating a proportionality requirement into the scope of discovery in the version of the FRCP that went into effect on December 1, 2015.

== Electronic discovery ==
Electronic discovery, also known as e-discovery, involves the discovery of electronic data and records. It is important that data obtained through e-discovery be reliable, and therefore admissible.

The two main approaches for identifying responsive material on custodian machines are:

1. Where physical access to the organisation's network is possible, agents are installed on each custodian machine, which push large amounts of data for indexing across the network to one or more servers that have to be attached to the network; or
2. For instances where it is impossible or impractical to attend the physical location of the custodian system, storage devices are attached to custodian machines (or company servers), and then each collection instance is manually deployed.

In relation to the first approach, there are several issues:

- In a typical collection process, large volumes of data are transmitted across the network for indexing, and this impacts normal business operations.
- The indexing process is not 100% reliable in finding responsive material.
- IT administrators are generally unhappy with the installation of agents on custodian machines.
- The number of concurrent custodian machines that can be processed is severely limited due to the network bandwidth required.

New technology is able to address problems created by the first approach by running an application entirely in memory on each custodian machine and only pushing responsive data across the network. This process has been patented and embodied in a tool that has been the subject of a conference paper.

In relation to the second approach, despite self-collection being a hot topic in e-discovery, concerns are being addressed by limiting the involvement of the custodian to simply plugging in a device and running an application to create an encrypted container of responsive documents.

== United States ==
Under the law of the United States, civil discovery is wide-ranging and may seek disclosure of information that is reasonably calculated to lead to the discovery of admissible evidence. This is a much broader standard than relevance, because it contemplates the exploration of evidence which might be relevant, rather than evidence which is truly relevant. (Issues of the scope of relevance are taken care of before trial with motions in limine and during trial with objections.) Certain types of information are generally protected from discovery; these include information which is privileged and the work product of the opposing party. Other types of information may be protected, depending on the type of case and the status of the party. For instance, juvenile criminal records are generally not discoverable, peer review findings by hospitals in medical negligence cases are generally not discoverable and, depending on the case, other types of evidence may be non-discoverable for reasons of privacy, difficulty or expense in complying and for other reasons. (Criminal discovery rules may differ from those discussed here.) Electronic discovery or "e-discovery" refers to discovery of information stored in electronic format (often referred to as Electronically Stored Information, or ESI). Courts have also begun addressing the discoverability of generative artificial intelligence inputs. In 2026, a federal court ordered disclosure of prompts used by an expert witness, finding that the prompts formed part of the expert's methodology and were therefore subject to discovery.

In practice, most civil cases in the United States are settled after discovery. After discovery, both sides often are in agreement about the relative strength and weaknesses of each side's case and this often results in either a settlement or summary judgment, which eliminates the expense and risks of a trial.

Discovery is also available in criminal cases. Under the rule set forth in Brady v. Maryland, the prosecutor is obligated to provide to the defendant any information that is exculpatory or potentially exculpatory, without any request by the defense. Further discovery is available if initiated by the defendant. For example, a discovery demand might be for production of the names of witnesses, witness statements, information about evidence, a request for opportunity to inspect tangible evidence, and for any reports prepared by expert witnesses who will testify at trial.

If a defendant in a criminal case requests discovery from the prosecution, the prosecutor may request reciprocal discovery. The prosecutor's right to discovery is deemed reciprocal as it arises from the defendant's request for discovery. The prosecutor's ability to obtain discovery is limited by the defendant's Fifth Amendment rights, specifically the defendant's constitutional protection against self-incrimination.

=== Federal law ===
Discovery in the United States is unique compared to other common law countries. In the United States, discovery is mostly performed by the litigating parties themselves, with relatively minimal judicial oversight. The Federal Rules of Civil Procedure guide discovery in the U.S. federal court system. Most state courts follow a similar version based upon the FRCP, Chapter V, "Depositions & Discovery".

According to the Federal Rules of Civil Procedure, the plaintiff must initiate a conference between the parties after the complaint was served to the defendants, to plan for the discovery process. The parties should attempt to agree on the proposed discovery schedule, and submit a proposed Discovery Plan to the court within 14 days after the conference. After that, the main discovery process begins which includes: initial disclosures, depositions, interrogatories, request for admissions (RFA) and request for production of documents (RFP). In most federal district courts, the formal requests for interrogatories, request for admissions and request for production are exchanged between the parties and not filed with the court. Parties, however, can file motion to compel discovery if responses are not received within the FRCP time limit. Parties can file a motion for a protective order if the discovery requests become unduly burdensome or for purpose of harassment.

In federal criminal prosecutions, discovery rights originate from a number of important Supreme Court decisions and statutes, the most important of which are,

- Brady v. Maryland, 373 U.S. 83 (1963), which requires a prosecuting attorney to disclose to a defendant any material which is potentially exculpatory or that would impeach the credibility of a prosecution witness. Brady also applies to evidence that would mitigate the defendant's sentence if a defendant is convicted.
- Jencks v. United States, 353 U.S. 657 (1957), and the Jencks Act, which requires federal prosecutors to produce any witness statement in the government's possession that relates to the subject of the witness' testimony, if that witness will testify against the defendant.
- Giglio v. United States, 405 U.S. 150 (1972) and the resulting Giglio rule, which requires that any deal with a witness that might call the witness's credibility into question must be disclosed in court. As a consequence, any plea bargain or deal made by the prosecutor with a witness in exchange for testimony should be disclosed to the defense as part of the discovery process.

The formal discovery process for federal criminal prosecutions is outlined in the Federal Rules of Criminal Procedure, Rule 16.

==== District of Columbia ====
The District of Columbia follows the federal rules, with a few exceptions. Some deadlines are different, and litigants may only resort to the D.C. Superior Court. Forty interrogatories, including parts and sub-parts, may be propounded by one party on any other party. There is no requirement for a "privilege log": federal Rule 26(b)(5) was not adopted by the D.C. Superior Court. Where above is stated "litigants may only resort to the D.C. Superior Court" upon correction is found according to the District of Columbia Superior Court Rules of Civil Procedure Section 73(b)Judicial Review and Appeal which states: "Judicial review of a final order or judgment entered upon direction of a hearing commissioner is available on motion of a party to the Superior Court judge designated by the Chief Judge to conduct such reviews...After that review has been completed, appeal may be taken to the District of Columbia Court of Appeals." This rule basically implies that in a civil action, if a hearing commissioner is authorized by all parties to conduct the proceedings instead of a judge, upon a request for a review or appeal, the motion must first be reviewed by a Superior Court judge to the same standard as a motion for appeal on a Superior Court Judge to the Court of Appeals, but the right to appeal to the higher courts still remains.

=== State law ===
Many states have adopted discovery procedures based on the federal system; some closely adhere to the federal model, others not so closely. Some states take an entirely different approach to discovery. Many states have adopted the Uniform Interstate Depositions and Discovery Act to provide uniform process when discovery is to be done out of state.

==== Alaska ====
In Alaska criminal courts, discovery is governed by Rule of Criminal Procedure 16 (Cr.R.16). The scope of discovery is broad and includes much more than is required by Brady v. Maryland, 373 U.S. 83 (1963). The discovery process is intended to provide adequate information for informed pleas, to expedite trial, minimize surprise, afford an opportunity for effective cross-examination, and meet the requirements of due process. To the extent possible, discovery prior to trial should be as full and free as possible, consistent with protection of persons, effective law enforcement, and the adversarial system.

A prosecuting attorney is required to disclose to the accused the following material, and to make it available for inspection and copying: (i) names and addresses of witnesses, (ii) written or recorded statements of the accused, (iii) written or recorded statements of a co-defendant, (iv) any books, papers, documents, photographs or tangible objects with the prosecutor intends to use at trial, (v) any prior criminal convictions of the defendant or any witness. In practice, this means that criminal defendants in Alaska are able to review any police report, lab report, audio/video recordings, witness statements, and more, before they proceed to trial. Most defendants will also have this material far enough in advance to have reviewed it before making a decision about any possible plea deal.

==== California ====
In California state courts, discovery is governed by the Civil Discovery Act of 1986 (Title 4 (Sections 2016-2036) of the Code of Civil Procedure), as subsequently amended. A significant number of appellate court decisions have interpreted and construed the provisions of the Act.

California written discovery generally consists of four methods: demands for inspection (the formal statutory name for requests for production of documents), form interrogatories, special interrogatories, and requests for admissions. The duty to respond to California discovery requests is not a continuing duty: the responding party only needs to respond with the facts as known on the date of the response, and is under no obligation to update its responses as new facts become known. This causes many parties to reserve one or two interrogatories until the closing days of discovery, when they ask if any of the previous responses to discovery have changed, and then ask what the changes are. Historically, California depositions were not limited in length until the Legislature enacted reforms in 2012. Another key difference is that most objections must be made in detail on the record at deposition or they are permanently waived. A party may only propound thirty-five written special interrogatories on any other single party unless the propounding party submits a "declaration of necessity". No "subparts, or a compound, conjunctive, or disjunctive question" may be included in an interrogatory. However, "form interrogatories" which have been approved by the state Judicial Council do not count toward this limit. In addition, no "preface or instruction" may be included in the interrogatories unless it has been approved by the Judicial Council; in practice, this means that the only instructions permissible with interrogatories are the ones provided with the form interrogatories.

=== Criticism ===
The use of discovery has been criticized as favoring the wealthier side in a lawsuit, by enabling parties to drain each other's financial resources in a war of attrition. For example, one can make information requests that are potentially expensive and time-consuming for the other side to fulfill, respond to a discovery request with thousands of documents of questionable relevance to the case, file requests for protective orders to prevent the deposition of key witnesses, and in other ways increase the difficulty and cost of discovery. In 1983, the Advisory Committee on Civil Rules attached a Committee Note to Rule 26 of the FRCP that cautioned federal courts to "prevent use of discovery to wage a war of attrition or as a device to coerce a party, whether financially weak or affluent", then had to repeat and stress that exact same text in the 2015 Committee Note.

It has been argued that although the goal of discovery is to level the playing field between the parties, the discovery rules instead create a multi-level playing field that favors the party that is in control of the information needed by the other party. Instead of encouraging discovery, the rules are described as encouraging lawyers to find new ways to manipulate and distort or conceal information.

Some tort reform supporters make a similar accusation, that discovery is used by plaintiffs' lawyers to impose costs on defendants in order to force settlements in unmeritorious cases to avoid the cost of discovery. However, others argue that discovery abuse is an exaggerated concept, that discovery works well in most cases, and exaggeration of American litigiousness and its cost result in confusion within the justice system.

To weed out spurious plaintiffs in mass tort cases, some courts may grant a defendant's pre-trial request for a Lone Pine order, which requires a plaintiff to show prima facie evidence of injury and specific causation via an expert's report, rather than dovetailing their claims with other plaintiffs.

As implemented in 1938, the modern American discovery scheme granted powers directly to private parties and their counsel which are "functionally equivalent" to the power to issue self-executing administrative subpoenas. This is why civil law countries strongly dislike and oppose American discovery: they regard broad discovery in the hands of private parties as destructive of the rule of law because from their perspective, the result amounts to "a private inquisition." Civil law countries see the underlying objectives of discovery as properly monopolized by the state in order to maintain the rule of law: the investigative objective of discovery is the prerogative of the executive branch, and insofar as discovery may be able to facilitate the creation of new rights, that is the prerogative of the legislative branch.

== England and Wales ==
The discovery process in England and Wales is known as 'disclosure'. This process occurs in both civil and criminal cases.

=== Criminal disclosure ===
Criminal disclosure is the process by which the Crown, typically through the Crown Prosecution Service, provides the defence with relevant information discovered during the course of a criminal investigation. The disclosure process helps protect the right to a fair trial. Every accused person has a right to a fair trial. This right is a fundamental part of the legal system in England and Wales and is guaranteed by Article 6 of the European Convention on Human Rights (ECHR).

The test for what information should be provided during disclosure is set by section 3 of the Criminal Procedure and Investigations Act 1996 (CPIA). This requires the Crown to provide all information which might be reasonably capable of undermining the prosecution case or assisting the defence case. This standard is an ongoing obligation throughout the lifespan of a criminal investigation and trial. While the majority of disclosure will likely take place at the outset of a trial - usually at or before the Pre-trial Preparation Hearing (PTPH), multiple disclosures may occur throughout a case as required.

The CPIA 1996 Disclosure Test

(1)The prosecutor must—

(a) disclose to the accused any prosecution material which has not previously been disclosed to the accused and which might reasonably be considered capable of undermining the case for the prosecution against the accused or of assisting the case for the accused, or

(b) give to the accused a written statement that there is no material of a description mentioned in paragraph

— Section 3 CPIA 1996

Detailed guidance on the manner in which disclosure is undertaken is offered by the Code of Practice for the CPIA 1996 and the Attorney General's Disclosure Guidelines.

The Attorney General's Disclosure Guidelines provide:

12. Investigators and prosecutors need to be aware of the delicate questions which arise when both the right to a fair trial and the privacy of complainants and witnesses are engaged. Fulfilling disclosure obligations is part of ensuring a fair trial in accordance with Article 6 of the ECHR. To comply with Article 6, during the course of an investigation, the investigator or prosecutor may decide that it is necessary to request and/or process personal or private information from a complainant or witness to pursue a reasonable line of inquiry; this includes, but is not limited to, digital material. 13. When seeking to obtain and review such material, investigators and prosecutors should be aware that these lines of inquiry may engage that individual's Article 8 rights and those rights in respect of other parties within that material.

— The Attorney General's Disclosure Guidelines 2020 Criminal disclosure interacts closely with the obligations placed on investigators to undertake all reasonable lines of inquiry, whether they point towards or away from the suspect. This requirement is created by para. 3.5 CPIA Code of Practice. While investigating, officers are therefore likely to encounter material which points away from the suspect and is in turn disclosable. In order to aid the investigation, narrow lines of inquiry and assist with efficient and effective disclosure the defence should also provide a defence case statement. This statement outlines the position taken by the suspect and will allow prosecutors to identify what is 'at issue' in the trial.

Contents of the Defence Case Statement

6A Contents of defence statement

(1) For the purposes of this Part a defence statement is a written statement—

(a) setting out the nature of the accused's defence, including any particular defences on which he intends to rely,

(b) indicating the matters of fact on which he takes issue with the prosecution,

(c) setting out, in the case of each such matter, why he takes issue with the prosecution,

(ca) setting out particulars of the matters of fact on which he intends to rely for the purposes of his defence,

(d) indicating any point of law (including any point as to the admissibility of evidence or an abuse of process) which he wishes to take, and any authority on which he intends to rely for that purpose.

==== Third party material ====
Third party material is a specific class of material identified by the fact that it originates outside the activity of the criminal inquiry or prosecution. Typically, third party material includes mobile device data; CCTV; and medical, therapeutic or local authority records. This material may reveal important information to the inquiry which may become evidence in the case. Where information from third party sources does not form part of the evidence, it may still need to be disclosed if it meets the disclosure test.

Access to third party material is governed by the Attorney General's Guidelines on Disclosure. These require that third party material must be relevant to a reasonable line of inquiry in order to be obtained. As such, third party material should never be accessed speculatively. It must always be based on a clear set of pre-existing reasons.

Access to third party material, especially in rape and serious sexual assault cases (RASSO), has come under heavy criticism from groups representing victims of these crimes. They argue that requests for material from victims has become excessive and that 'requests often go far beyond simply seeking contemporaneous records, or records known to contain evidence that relates to the incident: indeed, often records are sought which span many years, and in circumstances where the victim/survivor is not aware of any relevant material existing within the records.'

The invasive nature of improper or excessive access to third party material has been accepted by the government in the end-to-end rape review, which sets out actions to be taken to reform the approach of the CPS and police to third party material.

Recent guidance and legal judgments, including the Court of Appeal case of R v Bater-James & Anor [2020] EWCA Crim 790 and the mobile phone extraction report by the Information Commissioner's Office have set out detailed principles for accessing third party material - especially in the case of mobile and digital information. These balance the rights to privacy of victims and witnesses with the right to fair trial for defendants.

=== Civil disclosure ===
The discovery process in the jurisdiction of England and Wales has been known as "disclosure" since the reforms to civil procedure introduced by Lord Justice Woolf in 1999.

For many types of cause of action (but not for example personal injury claims, which have their own additional parts of procedure rules to follow) disclosure is governed by Part 31 of the Civil Procedure Rules (CPR), and its linked Practice Direction (PD) 31B on disclosure of electronic documents, adopted in October 2010. The purpose of the Practice Direction is "to encourage and assist the parties to reach agreement in relation to the disclosure of Electronic Documents in a proportionate and cost-effective manner". As in the United States, certain documents are privileged, such as letters between solicitors and experts.

The usual forms of discovery are general discovery and specific discovery since parties in issue are unlikely to reach agreements as to what ought to be disclosed. This reflects in the current discovery rules which put emphasis on compliance of time limit, rules on service, proper list of documents and rules on privileges set out in Part 31 of CPR and PD 31B. Once a party properly conducts general discovery in accordance with discovery rules and procedures, documents are deemed discoverable, i.e. documents are available for inspection. Inspectionability refers to procedural and legal elements: the former concerns clerical production of documents; the latter concerns the relevance test (Peruvian Guano v Financiaso Compagneiage (1881) 10 EWR 125) and linkage test.

A mandatory disclosure pilot was introduced on 1 January 2019 for use in relation to a range of claims handled by the Business and Property Courts, in order to support a more co-operative approach to disclosure, the scope of the documents to be disclosed being "not wider than is reasonable and proportionate ... in order fairly to resolve [the] issues". On 5 October 2022 these rules (with some minor changes) became permanent.

== Ireland ==
In the criminal law of the Republic of Ireland, the prosecution does not have a general obligation to give the defence all evidence in the case of a summary prosecution, but must do so if the right to a fair trial would otherwise be compromised. For a trial on indictment, the prosecution is required to serve certain classes of document to the defence counsel; these documents are collectively referred to as the book of evidence. The phrase gives its name to The Book of Evidence, a 1989 novel by John Banville.

== See also ==
- Early case assessment
- Second request
- subpoena ad testificandum
- subpoena duces tecum
