= Rule B Attachment =

Rule B attachments are issued under Rule B of the Supplemental Rules for Certain Admiralty and Maritime Claims of the Federal Rules of Civil Procedure. Under that provision, the court is allowed to attach a defendant's property up to the value of the suit. Although these claims are filed during in personam actions, they are in rem in nature, as the Court is attaching property to the suit. This has been described as a "remedy quasi in rem."

The Rule B procedure is in addition to the in rem procedure for arresting vessels that is available under Rule C.

== History ==
Attachment under Rule B is similar to the procedure of saisie conservatoire available under French law. It has its origins in the former British procedure of admiralty attachment, which was still in existence at the time of the American Revolution but fell into disuse in the United Kingdom at the end of the 18th Century. Maritime attachments were formally recognized by the Supreme Court of the United States in 1825 in Manro v. Almeida, in which Justice Johnson stated:

Upon the whole, we are of opinion, that for a maritime trespass, even though it savours of piracy, the person injured may have his action in personam, and compel appearance by the process of attachment on the goods of the trespasser, according to the forms of the civil law, as ingrafted upon the admiralty practice. And we think it indispensable to the purposes of justice, and the due exercise of the admiralty jurisdiction, that the remedy should be applied, even in cases where the same goods may have been attachable under the process of foreign attachment issuing from the common law Courts. For it will necessarily follow, in all such cases, that a question peculiarly of admiralty cognisance, will be brought to be examined before a tribunal not competent to exercise original admiralty jurisdiction; and that, as a primary, not an incidental question; since the whole proceeding will have for its object to determine whether a maritime trespass has been committed, and then to apply the remedy.

The Supreme Court issued the Rules of Practice in Causes of Admiralty and Maritime Jurisdiction in 1844 to govern such proceedings, which substantially remained in force until 1966 when the current Supplemental Rules were adopted.

== Nature of the procedure ==
Attachment is not dependent, as is arrest in rem, on the existence of a maritime lien or preferred mortgage lien, but necessitates merely an in personam claim against the defendant which falls within U.S. admiralty jurisdiction. It does not require the applicant to show that the attachment is necessary to satisfy a potential judgment. Unlike in rem proceedings, the property that can be attached is not restricted to maritime property, and it may be either tangible or intangible.

The US courts have taken an expansive view as to what constitutes a claim that may fall under maritime jurisdiction, which can include:

- non-compete and non-disclosure agreements that relate to maritime commerce,
- forward freight agreements,
- joint venture agreements involving aspects of maritime commerce, and
- settlement agreements arising from maritime disputes.

To secure a writ of maritime attachment pursuant to Rule B, the plaintiff must show that:

1. he has an in personam claim against the defendant which is cognizable in admiralty;
2. the defendant "cannot be found within the district" in which the action is commenced;
3. property belonging to the defendant is present or will soon be present in the district; and
4. there is no statutory or general maritime law proscription to the attachment.

The procedure's advantages can be described through the following scenario:

1. A shipyard provides repair services in the Caribbean under a contract which calls for the application of English law. The shipyard allows the vessel to sail prior to full payment, and the debt goes unpaid.
2. The ship sails into a US port where the shipowner has no presence.
3. Under English law, no maritime lien, as defined by the US courts, exists on the vessel, so the ship is not subject to a Rule C arrest.
4. Under Rule B, however, the shipyard may attach the debtor vessel, a sister vessel, or any other assets of the debtor found in the jurisdiction even if they are in the hands of a third party.

Attachment may extend to a co-defendant or a third party, and can include guarantors and alter egos of the original vessel owner. Where the underlying claim is subject to foreign law and will be litigated or arbitrated in a foreign proceeding, federal maritime law governs whether Rule B attachment will be applicable.

In the event of a counterclaim, counter-security may be posted under FRCP Rule E. The courts have been prepared to enforce this through staying foreign arbitration in London pending such posting, as well as issuing gag orders in special circumstances in order to assist in attaining such security.

The procedure may not prove to be effective in several circumstances:

- the attachment could be "futile" where a superior claim exists in the property
- there is a risk that the shipowner may become bankrupt
- the vessel may prove to be a white elephant (ie, it has no market, even if it is in good condition)

Parties that have entered into foreign insolvency proceedings may be able to obtain protection from Rule B attachments by applying for a stay of proceedings under Chapter 15 of the United States Bankruptcy Code.

== Controversy over electronic fund transfers ==
In the 2002 case Winter Storm Shipping v. TPI, the United States Court of Appeals for the Second Circuit held that an electronic fund transfer (EFT) which passes through intermediary banks in the Southern District of New York was subject to Rule B. Specifically the Court found that due process was served even though the defendant was unaware of which bank would be targeted, these transfers constituted intangible property under the meaning of Rule B, and that federal law preempted New York state law prohibiting attachment of EFTs.

The effect of this ruling was far reaching. Considering that the Southern District contains New York City, and more importantly the numerous large financial institutions therein, this allowed the federal courts to attach billions of dollars in EFTs because pieces of electronic information representing those dollars had passed fleetingly through the Southern District.

=== Narrowing Winter Storm ===
As the number of Rule B attachment claims increased, the Second Circuit narrowed the rule in several ways, such as holding that the Court has discretion to vacate the order of attachment if there is another convenient, available forum where the plaintiff may find the defendant or that a foreign corporation may be "found" within the Southern District simply by registering with the State of New York.

=== Overruled by Jaldhi ===
In October 2009 the Second Circuit overruled the Winter Storm decision in the case of Shipping Corporation of India v. Jaldhi. In the Jaldhi case, the Court held that EFTs were not in fact property as contemplated by Rule B and furthermore, that the practical effect of the decision on banks was unforeseen and far too detrimental. The Court took notice of a recent decision where the presiding judge noted:

This Court was recently informed that, currently, leading New York banks receive numerous new attachment orders and over 700 supplemental services of existing orders each day. This is confirmed by the striking surge in maritime attachment requests in this district, which now comprise approximately one third of all cases filed in the Southern District of New York. As a consequence, New York banks have hired additional staff, and suffer considerable expenses, to process the attachments. The sheer volume ... leads to many false "hits" of funds subject to attachment, which has allegedly introduced significant uncertainty into the international funds transfer process.

Overruling a case as recent as Winter Storm is generally not seen, and furthermore overruling of a Circuit decision requires a panel of the entire Circuit, but the Court's recognition of their error prompted them to circulate the opinion in a mini-en banc filing. None of the Second Circuit justices protested the result and Winter Storm was overruled. The Supreme Court declined to hear the Jaldhi appeal.

While the Southern District may no longer be such an attractive venue for pursuing pre-judgment attachments in maritime cases (as it was estimated that the volume of civil cases filed there declined by 30% as a result of Jaldhi), other developments in New York State law may compensate by making it desirable for pursuing the rights of maritime and non-maritime judgment creditors (but that jurisprudence is still evolving).
