= Dispositive motion =

Type of legal motion

In law, a dispositive motion is a motion seeking a trial court order entirely disposing of all or part of the claims in favor of the moving party without need for further trial court proceedings. "To dispose" of a claim means to decide the claim in favor of one or another party. As a lawsuit may comprise numerous claims made by and against numerous parties, not every dispositive motion seeks to dispose of the entire lawsuit. In the U.S., the most common type of dispositive motions seeking to dispose of the entire lawsuit are those for summary judgment. Many U.S. state jurisdictions also provide for a "partial summary judgment" or motion for "summary adjudication of issues" which only seeks to dispose of part of a lawsuit. See, e.g., California Code of Civil Procedure section 437c(f)(1). Regardless whether the dispositive motion is for summary judgment or adjudication, the motion must be supported by declarations under oath, excerpts from depositions which are also under oath, admissions of fact by the opposing party and other discovery such as interrogatories, as well as a legal argument (points and authorities). The other party may respond with counter-declarations, discovery responses, and legal arguments attempting to show that these issues were "triable issues of fact." If there is any question as to whether there is conflict on the facts on an issue, the summary judgment or adjudication must be denied regarding that matter.

In many cases, a decision on a dispositive motion is a prerequisite for appellate review. See, e.g., Wash. Rules of Appellate Procedure 2.2.

The two principal types of dispositive motions in contemporary American legal practice are the motion to dismiss (sometimes referred to as a demurrer in a minority of U.S. state jurisdictions) and the motion for summary judgment or summary adjudication of issues. A dispositive motion may also be used to request that an indictment be dismissed or quashed, or for judgment on pleadings. At least in some jurisdictions, a corporation's motion to terminate a shareholder's derivative suit is treated as a dispositive motion. See, e.g., Dreiling v. Jain, 151 Wn.2d 900, 93 P.3d 861 (2004).
