= Under seal =

Sensitive or confidential, in a legal context

Filing under seal is a procedure allowing sensitive or confidential information to be filed with a court without becoming a matter of public record. The court generally must give permission for the material to remain under seal.

Filing confidential documents "under seal" separated from the public records allows litigants to navigate the judicial system without compromising their confidentiality, at least until there is an affirmative decision by consent of the information's owner or by order of the court to publicize it.

When the document is filed under seal, it should have a clear indication for the court clerk to file it separately – most often by stamping words "Filed Under Seal" on the bottom of each page. The person making the filing should also provide instructions to the court clerk that the document needs to be filed "under seal". Courts often have specific requirements for these filings in their Local Rules.

Normally records should not be filed under seal without court permission. However, Federal Rule of Civil Procedure 5.2 allows a person making a redacted filing to also file an unredacted copy under seal.
