= Request for admissions =

A request for admission (sometimes also called a request to admit) is a set of statements sent from one litigant to an adversary, for the purpose of having the adversary admit or deny the statements or allegations therein. Requests for admission are part of the discovery process in a civil case. In the U.S. federal court system, they are governed by Rule 36 of the Federal Rules of Civil Procedure.

== Basic structure ==
Requests for admission are a list of questions which are similar in some respects to interrogatories, but different in form and purpose. Each "question" is in the form of a declarative statement which the answering party must then either admit, deny, or state in detail why they can neither admit nor deny the truthfulness of the statement (e.g. for lack of knowledge, etc.). This effectively puts the admissions in the form of true-false questions. For example, in a case involving an automobile accident, the plaintiff might include in their request a statement such as "Defendant Smith was driving a blue Dodge Caravan on the morning of the accident".

Under Rule 36(a)(5) of the Federal Rules of Civil Procedure, the answering party may also object to the request, and state the reason for their objection, so long as the objection is not solely because the request would present a genuine issue of fact for trial.

Rule 36(a)(1) limits the types of requests to be limited to (A) facts, the application of law to fact, or opinions about either; and (B) the genuineness of any described documents. However, the rule places no limits on the number of requests which may be made of either litigant. State court rules, however, may be stricter than this.

Notably, under Rule 36(a)(3), requests for admission are automatically deemed admitted in U.S. federal courts if the opponent fails to timely respond or object. The opponent bears the burden of moving for relief from its failure to respond and providing a legitimate excuse for why it did not respond earlier.

Some U.S. states have reversed the burden as set forth in the federal rules, such that the party propounding the RFAs must follow up with a motion to have RFAs deemed admitted.

== Purpose ==
Requests for admission help narrow the scope of the controversy by getting certain admissions or denials of issues relevant to the lawsuit on record before a trial takes place. While evidence introduced at trial can be rebutted, admissions which are on record must be taken as true unless the judge permits them to be withdrawn or amended. Thus, requests for admission can obviate presentation of some evidence and make the actual trial shorter and more efficient. Admissions are also useful at summary judgment, as an admission will generally mean that there is no issue of material fact about the question the admission relates to.

Also, Federal Rules of Civil Procedure have placed 25 questions per party limitations on the use of interrogatories, but there is no numerical limit in FRCP on the requests for admission (unless specified differently in Local Rules of the state, which most states do have). In California, requests for admission are generally limited to the numerical limit of 35. However, a party in California who wishes for additional requests for admission may make a declaration for additional discovery.
