= Request for production =

A request for production is a legal request for documents, electronically stored information, or other tangible items made in the course of litigation. In civil procedure, during the discovery phase of litigation, a party to a lawsuit may request that another party provide any documents that it has that pertain to the subject matter of the lawsuit. For example, a party in a court case may obtain copies of email messages sent by employees of the opposing party.

The responding party is required to furnish copies of any documents that are responsive to the request, except for those that are legally privileged. The responding party also can submit a response to the requestor explaining why the documents cannot be produced. For example, the responding party may indicate that documents are unavailable because they have been destroyed, that it would be unduly burdensome to produce the documents, or that the documents are not in possession of the responding party. However, the requestor then may file a motion to compel discovery to ask the court to order the responding party to produce documents.

The rules governing requests for the production of documents vary from jurisdiction to jurisdiction; in the U.S. Federal court system, such requests are governed by Rule 34 of the Federal Rules of Civil Procedure.

== See also ==
- Electronic discovery
- Inspection of documents
- Second request (law)
