= Second request =

In United States antitrust law, a second request is a discovery procedure by which the Federal Trade Commission and the Antitrust Division of the Justice Department investigate mergers and acquisitions which may have anticompetitive consequences.

== Legal basis ==
Under the Hart-Scott-Rodino Antitrust Improvements Act, before certain mergers, tender offers or other acquisition transactions can close, both parties to the deal must file a "Notification and Report Form" with the Federal Trade Commission (FTC) and the Assistant Attorney General in charge of the Antitrust Division.

If either the FTC or the Antitrust Division has reason to believe the merger will impede competition in a relevant market, they may request more information by way of "Request for Additional Information and Documentary Materials", more commonly referred to as a "Second Request".

== Substance of request ==
A typical second request asks to gather information about the sales, facilities, assets, and structure of the businesses which are party to the transaction. This frequently requires a large number of documents to be produced, and law firms representing parties to a transaction in which a second request has been issued often must hire contract attorneys to review all the documents involved.

Parties to a transaction who feel that the second request is unnecessary or needlessly duplicative of information discovered earlier may appeal to either the FTC or the Antitrust Division (whichever agency issued the request).
