= Federal Equity Rules =

The Federal Equity Rules were rules that governed civil procedure in suits of equity in the federal judiciary of the United States from 1822 until superseded by the Federal Rules of Civil Procedure in 1938.

== Background ==
Article III of the United States Constitution gave the federal courts jurisdiction over common-law actions and suits in equity. In England, courts of law and equity were separate, a tradition that endured in some states, while federal courts had both types of jurisdiction.

The Rules were established by the United States Supreme Court which was authorized by the United States Congress to make rules governing the form of mesne process, form and mode of proceeding in suits of equity and the power to proscribe form of process, mode of framing and filing of proceedings or pleading and generally regulate the whole process of suits in equity Sets of rules were promulgated in 1822, 1842 (amended in 1850, 1854, 1861, 1864, 1869, 1871, 1875, 1879, 1882, 1890, 1892, 1893 and 1894), and in 1912 (amended in 1924, 1930 and 1932). The 1912 Rules were superseded in 1938 by the Federal Rules of Civil Procedure which were largely based on the 1912 Rules.

Equity jurisdiction was, by tradition and history, intended to provide relief when no adequate legal remedy existed, and the Process Act of 1792 provided for equity actions in federal courts to conform to these principles. The rules promulgated by the Supreme Court in 1822, 1842, 1912 maintained this tradition, and Chief Justice John Jay directed federal judges to consult the English chancery practices when needed.
