= Subpoena ad testificandum =

Court order to give testimony

A subpoena ad testificandum is a court summons to appear and give oral testimony for use at a hearing or trial. The use of a writ for purposes of compelling testimony originated in the ecclesiastical courts of Church during the High Middle Ages, especially in England. The use of the subpoena writ was gradually adopted over time by civil and criminal courts in England and the European continent.

== History ==
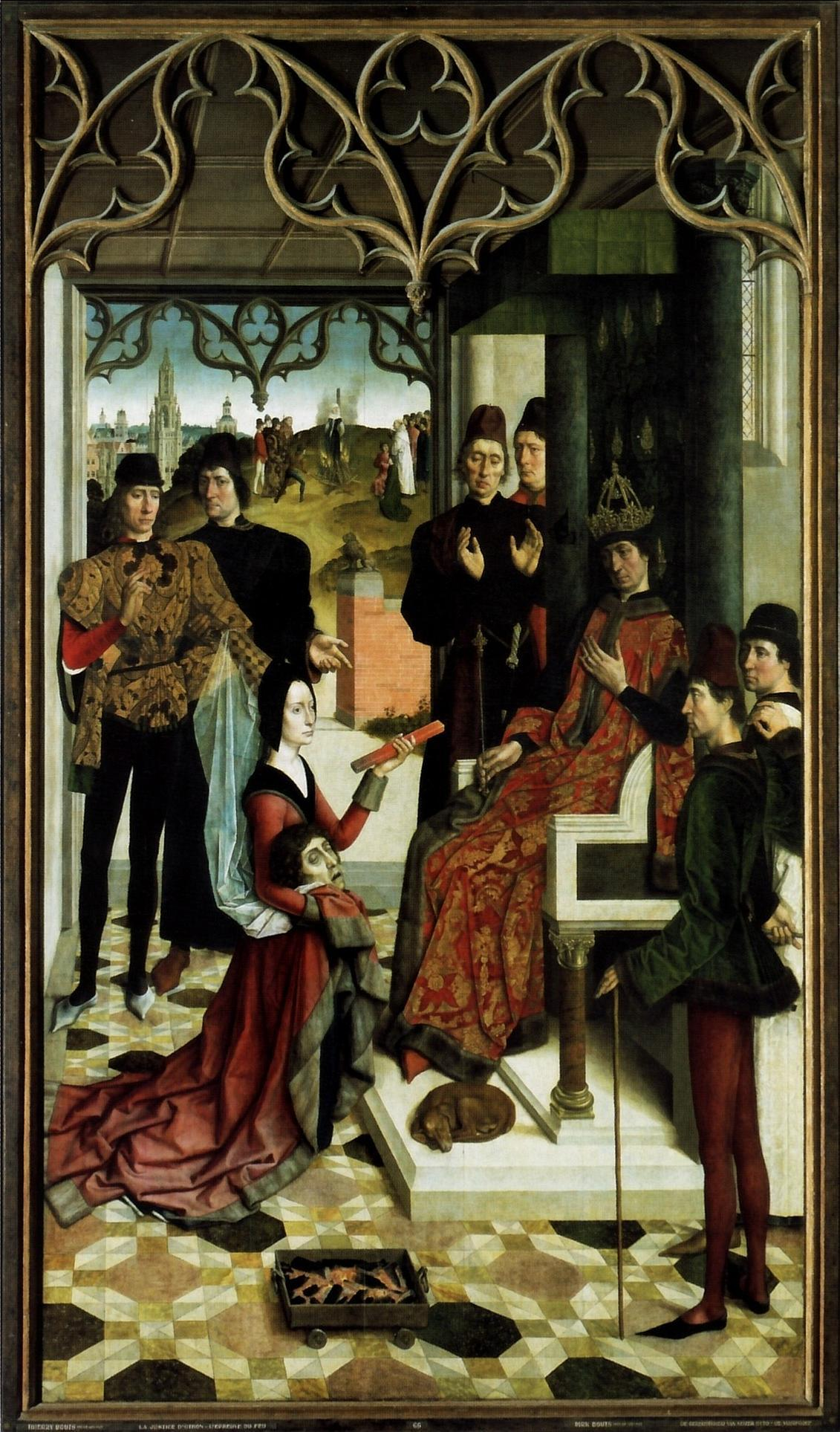
Prior to the Fourth Lateran Council, the norm was trial by ordeal.

The subpoena developed as a creative writ, the "writ subpoena", from the Court of Chancery. Writs of many kinds formed the essential parts of litigation. The primary function of a writ in the 13th and 14th centuries was to convey the king's commands to his officers and servants. It was irrelevant what the nature of those commands might be. The Register of Writs shows a large variety of writs to be administrative in nature, as opposed to judicial. These former writs acquired the name prerogative writs in the 17th and 18th centuries. Prerogative writs that have survived into modern law are the writ of mandamus and writ of certiorari. The medieval writ of prohibition played an important part in the conflict between the church and state in England. The writ was also used in the courts of admiralty and local courts. It has survived in relative obscurity in United States law. The writ subpoena began to be attached to a wide variety of writs in the 14th century. These were an invention of the Court of Equity, which were a part of Chancery. Thus, "subpoena" was a product of the ecclesiastical courts in England. The commonest writ from this era was the Praecipe quod reddat ("You are commanded to return [some misappropriated good or land]"). To these were often added the phrase sub poena ("under penalty").

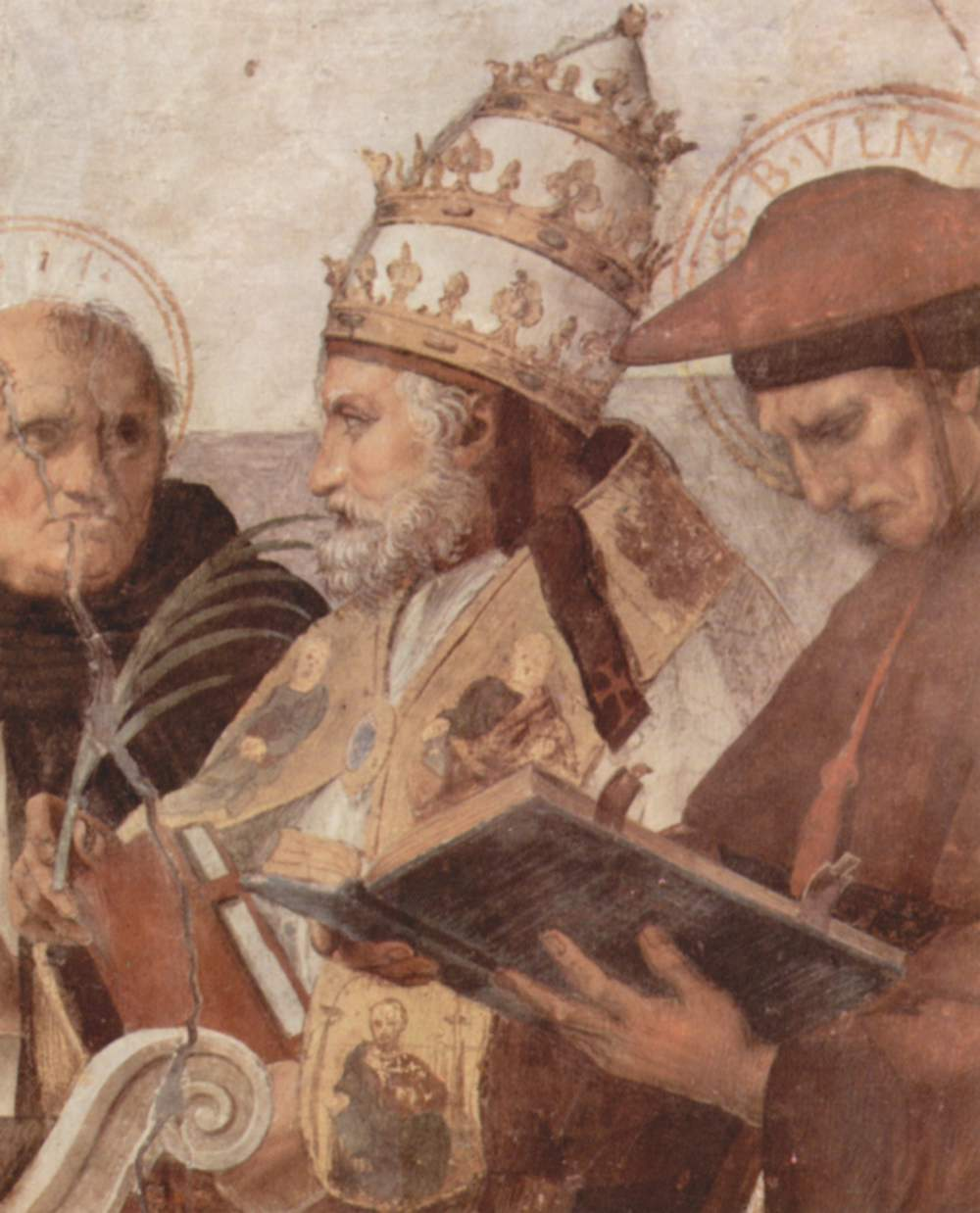
Pope Innocent III was indirectly responsible for the use of subpoena when trial by ordeal was outlawed by the Fourth Lateran Council

The development of the writ subpoena is closely associated with the invention of due process, which slowly replaced trial by ordeal. The institution of the jury trial necessitated the hearing of evidence. This, in turn led to the need for a reliable method of compelling witnesses to appear and give testimony. The writ subpoena became the standard method of compelling witnesses. Following the Fourth Lateran Council held in 1215 (overseen by Pope Innocent III who was at the zenith of Papal power), and based on a Latin interpretation of natural moral law, all forms of trial by ordeal or trial by battle were outlawed in Church courts. Of greater significance to English law was that the clergy were banned from blessing trial by ordeal in the civil and common law courts. This had the effect of bringing the practice of trial by ordeal to an abrupt halt in England. Trial by battle, which later evolved into a method of settling scores by dueling, was less affected. These had never had, nor did they require, the blessing of the Church. They were never a part of Latin or Roman law, but had been prevalent in the underlying Celtic and Saxon cultures. Trial by ordeal had always been viewed with skepticism and condescension by Latin lawyers and intelligentsia. Trial by battle, for the sake of honor had a long and proud tradition in Rome, and remained prominent in Roman lands. It had been banned by the Church courts on the Continent. Those who wanted to duel simply ignored the ban.

Following the Fourth Lateran Council, the civil and common law courts quickly moved to ban trial by ordeal and trial by combat. Implementation proved to be more difficult. What would take their place? The novel choice was trial by jury. In many places, this change was seen as radical and was met with great doubts about its effectiveness. There was a reluctance to accept juries on a large scale by many of the English courts, and the public at large. People were used to a system where decisions were made by the outcome of a duel or an ordeal. The jury system had made a sporadic appearance in England from time to time, including, but not limited to Danelaw and the Saxons. Even so, juries had never been predominant. A jury remained a local and obscure phenomenon. It was generally believed that God's will was revealed in the outcome of the battle or ordeal. The fact that the judge would view the result of the ordeal and declare "God's decision" had little bearing on the validity of the procedure. The jury was something else. It did not represent God and its twelve or more members were likely to fail to deliver God's solution.

Cases which had no resolution, just as today, could easily be mocked by the public if the decision by the jury was inconclusive, or not in agreement with all the facts, or with emotions of the populace. Trial by ordeal or battle avoided these problems. The result in difficult cases was almost always clear cut. Judges were spared tough decisions.

1215 was also the year of the Magna Carta. Among other things, it limited the Courts of Eyre. These were circuit riding courts of the King which were roundly feared and hated. They had a reputation for being imperious and angry. There was thought to be little mercy in the Courts of Eyre. Magna Carta limited the Courts of Eyre to visiting the same location once every seven years.

=== Procedure on bills in Eyre and bills in Chancery ===
The question inevitably arises: Did the writ subpoena develop in the Court of Eyre, or in the Court of Chancery? There were writs of a somewhat similar nature to be found in both courts. Bills (writs of complaints) were the method by which a litigant could make his story known in the courts of 13th and 14th century England. Because novel fact patterns frequently emerged, there was a tendency to become creative in the writing of bills of complaint and writs. Against this novelty, was a strong reaction, wanting to keep the number of writs to a minimum. An example is seen from the time of Edward II of England: in 1310–1311 John Soke, a litigant appearing in person before the Common Bench, exclaimed in great frustration, "For God's sake, can I have a writ to attaint this fraud?" Judge Stanton replied, "Make your bill and you shall have what the court can allow." This illustrates the great flexibility of the writing of writs to conform to the changing fact situations as they varied from case to case. At that time, a plaintiff who sued by bill was not liable to fail for defects in the form of a bill, provided the bill told an intelligible and consistent story.

As a matter of procedure, the judge would question the plaintiff in order to bring out the cause of the complaint. Once this was accomplished, the subsequent proceeding under the bill would be carried out as if there was a legitimate writ. By the 15th century, the bill would typically pray that a subpoena should be issued to secure the appearance and examination of the defendant. At the bottom of the bill were the names of the pledges to prosecute. These were similar to the bills issued by the Court of Eyre. Those subpoenas issued in Chancery at the time of Henry VI of England were required to have a pledge attached. Statute at that time prohibited the issue of a writ of subpoena until the plaintiff had found sureties to satisfy the defendant's damages if he did not prevail in his case. When the defendant appeared, both the plaintiff and his witnesses, and the defendant and any witnesses which he might produce, were examined by the Chancellor. Production of documents could be demanded via subpoena duces tecum. It has been suggested that the writ subpoena was very similar to the bill of Eyre. However, in the opinions of Professor Adams, Sir Frederick Pollock, 3rd Baronet and Professor Powicke, it is erroneous to conclude that the writ subpoena came from the Bill of Eyre. It came from Chancery.

The source of the word writ, or writ subpoena has been ambiguous. The Statute of Westminster II (1285) under the section in consimili casu (in similar case), attempted to limit the number of writs that could be issued.

=== Development prior to the writ subpoena ===
After the quick abolition of trial by ordeal, the novel approach was to call a jury to consider the case. Some situations were not difficult. As an example, from 1221 there is the case of Thomas de la Hethe. He had been presented by the grand jury with an indictment accusing him of being an associate of a notorious felon named Howe Golightly. Thomas refused to put himself on the country (accept a jury trial). Notwithstanding this refusal, the court declined to permit him any sort of trial by ordeal, but realizing the gravity of the situation they empanelled an impressive jury of twenty-four knights. These found Thomas guilty, and therefore he was hanged. At this time, even a villain who refused jury trial might have a panel of twenty-four knights.

Such a large and distinguished trial by jury consisting of twenty-four knights shows the court's apprehension at depriving a man of his right to a trial by ordeal. Another example comes from the same year, 1221. An indictment indicated that the carcass of a stolen cow was discovered in William's shed. William did not express a claim to any particular sort of trial. He did state that the cow had been placed there by his lord, so that the latter could get his land as an escheat for felony. The serjeant who arrested William stated that the lord's wife had arranged for his arrest. In such a case, the court simply asked the indictors for more information. They related the whole story; William was acquitted by the court and the lord was committed to gaol.

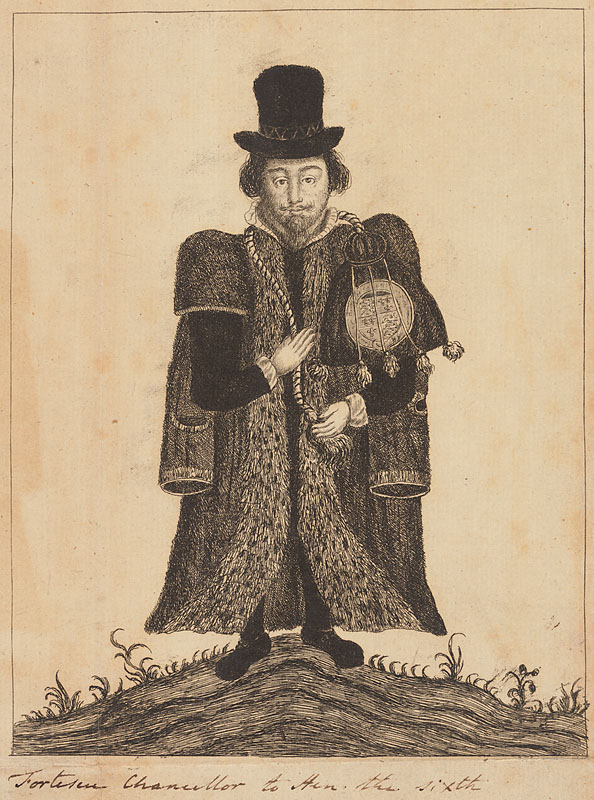
John Fortescue (judge) gives a picture of modern-form jury trials.

In this case, the court quickly detected the plot and merely needed confirmation. But what of cases where the facts were not clear, or the decision was difficult? It was these that provided the gravest difficulties with jury trials following the abolition of trial by ordeal. Upon the calling of a general Court of Eyre, it was easy to assemble a thousand or more jurors, who could be questioned, and pronounce a prisoner guilty or not. If the proceedings were instigated upon the delivery and indictment from a gaol, before a non-professional judge, most prisoners were coerced to put themselves upon the mercy of a jury trial, and forgo their ancient right to trial by ordeal. If they refused a jury trial, there was no option but to keep them in prison until they changed their mind.

Under these circumstances, the jury became a new form of ordeal. The judges, in difficult cases ceased to be inquisitors, and simply came to accept the verdict of the jury. The accused was pronounced either "guilty" or "not guilty". This result soon came to be accepted with as little doubt, as much as the result of the hot iron or cold water was accepted a generation earlier. At first, there was no compulsion to deem the actions of a jury with any more rationality than that of the ordeal. The ordeal had shown God's judgment in the matter. The verdict of the jury, while not necessarily congruent with God's will, nonetheless, was inscrutable. Over the course of a generation or so after 1215, the jury system began to be rationalized and regarded as a judicial body.

Bracton (circa 1250) seemed to be fairly complacent with the jury as an institution. Other contemporaneous writers were markedly dissatisfied with the jury. The Mirror of Justices contains a violent attack on the jury system from 1290. In those parts of France where the jury system took root at the same time, there were tremendous protests against it, as being oppressive.

From the time of Edward I of England onward, the function of the jury was slowly being judicially defined. Questions of law were being separated from questions of fact. Arguments centered around questions like: Is a jury conclusion of 11 to 1 enough to convict for a crime?

In 1468, Sir John Fortescue gives a picture of jury trials which is congruent with the modern form. The jury had come to be regarded as twelve men who could be of open mind. Witnesses were examined under oath. Parties or their counsel were presenting facts and evidence to the jury. A century later, Sir Thomas Smith gives a vivid account of the jury trial with examination, cross-examination, all in front of the judge and jury.

=== The problem of maintenance and other corruptions of the jury system ===
Shortly after the institution of the jury system, with its attendant seeking of evidence, based on testimony given by witnesses, the problem of maintenance developed. Maintenance was the practice of witnesses coming forward to provide testimony at trial, without being asked to do so. These were frequently well-meaning friends or family members who wanted to participate or help sway the verdict of the trial. The Statute of Westminster I (1275) had fifty-one chapters. One of these dealt with the issue of maintenance.

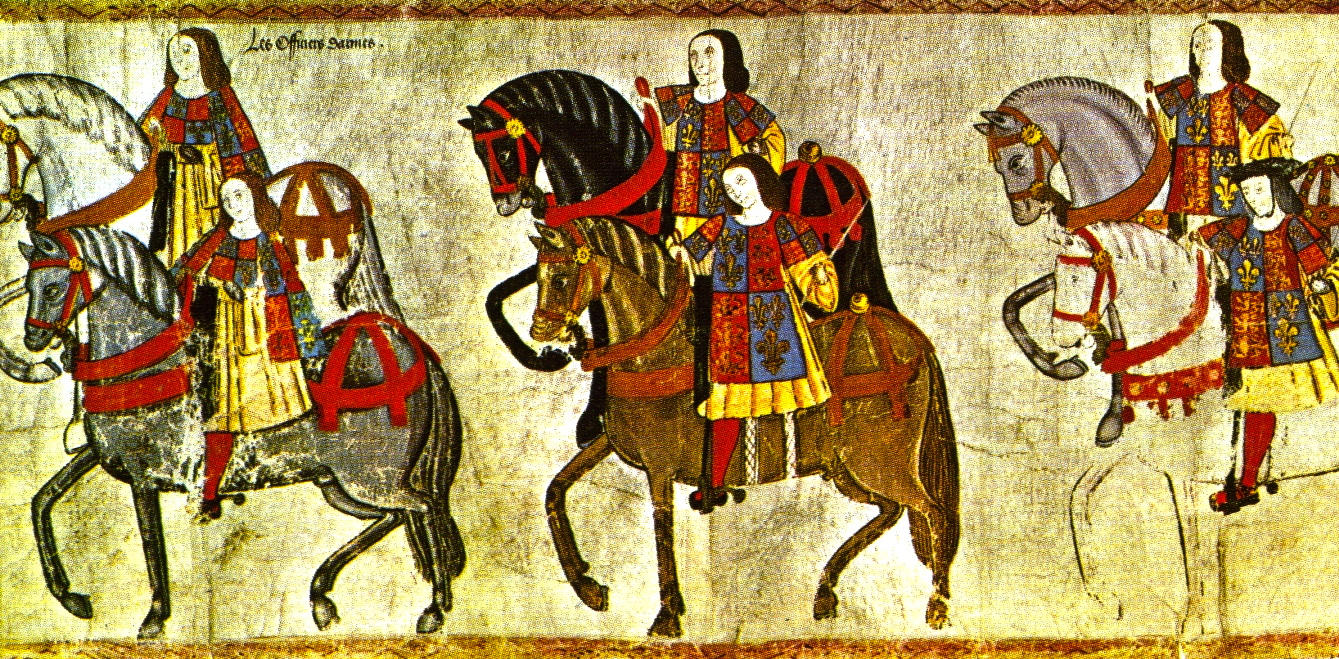
Early juries might consist of twenty-four knights. Later maintenance and corruption became problematic.

There are numerous references indicating that there had developed a class of professional testifiers, quite apart from lawyers and advocates, who could be purchased to testify in jury trials. There was an effort to end this practice by providing punishment to whole categories of professional testifiers, such as serjeant-pleaders.

Sir John Fortescue was of the opinion that anyone who came forward to volunteer to give testimony in a case should be tried for maintenance, since he should have waited to be issued a writ of subpoena.

Sir Thomas Smith commented that the jury system in the time of Elizabeth could not exist without the ability to compel testimony using the writ subpoena. At this time, maintenance was viewed as the primary evil of the legal system. Political songs of the day evoked the problem: "At Westminster halle (Legis sunt valde scientes); Nevertheless for hem alle (Ibi vincuntur jura potentes...); His owne cause many a man (Nunc judicial et moderatur); Law helpeth noght than (Ergo lex evacuatur)."

The strictness with which the courts interpreted the laws against maintenance was an expression of the censure of the common law. But the censure, overall, proved to be ineffectual. By the Fifteenth Century, the law had become corrupted, and was only another weapon, along with physical violence, for the unscrupulous to achieve their ends. In 1450, Cade proclaimed: "The law serveth of nowght ellys in thes days, but for to do wrong, for nothying is sped almost but false maters by colour of the law for mede, drede and favor." Perjury was not a crime in those days. Maintenance, along with champerty, appearing armed before a justice of the law, giving of liveries, forgery of deeds, and other corrupting influences were banned under Edward III of England.

An example of the corruption is seen in the 1445 case of Janycoght de Gales who had been committed to prison until he paid the sum of 388 pounds which was owed to Robert Shirbourne, a draper of London. Janycoght procured a testifier in maintenance, George Grenelawe who accused him of larceny. The idea was that Janycoght would be convicted of larceny, sentenced to Fleet prison, then released because of obligations owed to him by the keepers of that prison. In this manner, he would escape the debt of Shirbourne. It was discovered that Grenelaw had fabricated the complaint.

The abuses were rampant. Increasing strictness against corruption of all kinds at jury trials made many reluctant to testify. The writ subpoena became a necessary answer to this problem.

=== Two competing court systems in medieval England ===
Court of Equity grew out of the Court of Chancery, which were controlled by the Church. There was a concern in these institutions that law be congruent with natural moral law. The great concern was equitable justice or "equity". This was not always seen in the common law courts, which were more pragmatic, and were concerned mainly with land law and inheritance.

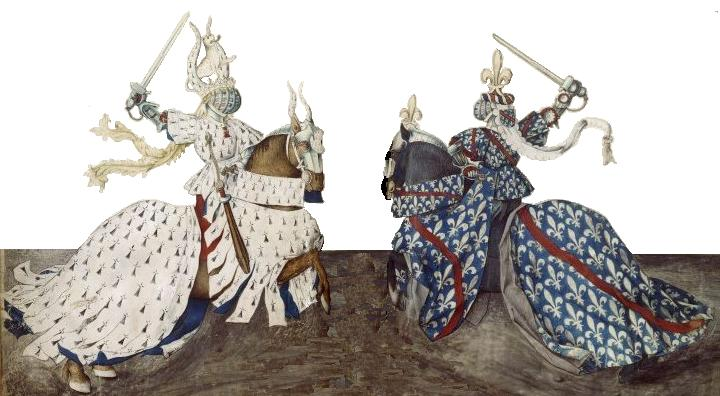
Trial by battle was a practice which proved difficult to control by rule of law.

Until the Late Middle Ages it was not apparent to contemporaries that there would be, or could be, two different and competing legal systems in England, one of them common law and the other equity. They were, however, aware of the conflicting courts. There was a conflict of jurisdiction. There were numerous complaints that various authorities had exceeded their power. Equity grew in its desire to deal with the de facto failings of the common law courts, and did not concern itself with doctrinal differences. Often, a suitor who was dissatisfied with the result in a common law court would refile the case in Equity or Chancery. These latter courts saw their role as being "equalizers": socially, legally, economically. In this position, and encouraged by Roman law traditions, they were always creative in producing new writs which could not be found in the common law courts. It was in this spirit that Justice Berrewyk in 1302, ordered an infant to be brought before the court with a writ subpoena: "under pain of (forfeit) of 100 pounds". But there is evidence that "threat of penalty" had been attached to writs used by the government to induce behavior as early as 1232. By 1350, the writ certis de causis (the "writ for certain causes"), began having the clause subpoena routinely attached. The writ quibusdam certis de causis is at least as old at 1346, and had subpoena attached. The great objection which common lawyers made to writs in this form was their failure to mention the cause of the summons. It became the custom in the common law courts that the person would not be compelled to appear without having notice of the reasons for appearing. Early subpoenas carried no notice of the reason for the summons. Objections in Parliament became loud and frequent. On the one hand, Chancery believed that a wrongdoer might engage in maintenance to prepare the verdict before appearing in court. On the other side, common law courts found it difficult to amend the presented writ, and many cases were lost for want of the correct writ at the beginning of the case.

=== Attempts to limit the writ subpoena ===
The rolls of the medieval English parliaments contain numerous petitions and acts directed against the Council and Chancery. The spirit of the Magna Carta, as well as some specific language within it, was the promise that justice in England to all citizens and their property would be in the common law courts, and nowhere else. In 1331, these proclamations were again re-enacted. In 1351, they were again recited. The King had to promise that the Council would not proceed without indictment of common law process on an original writ. It was ignored. In 1363, the command to Chancery was repeated by legislature. There was a proclamation that there be no original writs. These pronouncements were ineffective and ignored. More legislation followed in 1389 and 1394. In 1415, the writ subpoena was denounced by name, as a subtlety invented by John Waltham. Another legislative act in 1421 called the subpoena not in accordance with due process. By this time, the Council and Chancery were firmly established. Further legislation only encouraged these institutions.

=== Modern times ===
Nowadays, a witness summons can be issued and served upon a person where it is necessary to secure their presence to testify in a court case. In England and Wales, witness summons are covered by Part 34 of the Civil Procedure Rules.

== Subpoena as generally defined in the United States ==
In order for the power of the court to compel the appearance and testimony of a witness in United States Federal Courts, or in various state courts, the person who is sought must be served with a subpoena.

The obligation of the individual to attend the court as a witness is enforced by a process of the court, particular process being the subpoena ad testificandum, commonly called the subpoena in the United States. This writ, or form, commands the witness, under penalty, to appear at a trial to give testimony. Thus, the subpoena is the mechanism for compelling the attendance of a witness.

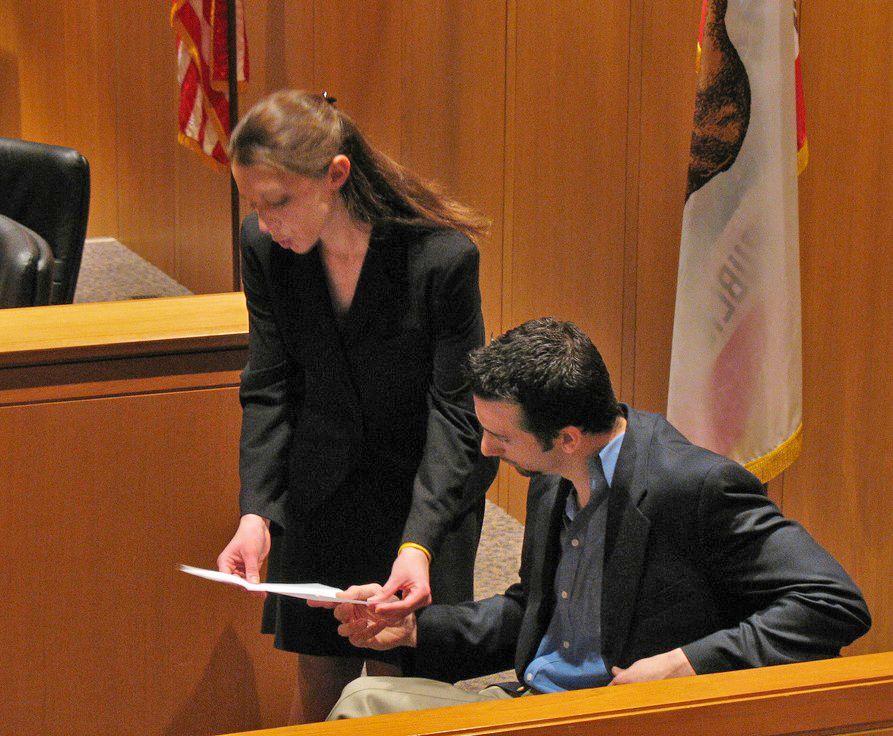
Subpoena ensures the right to confront witnesses in a court of law.

The court did not err in refusing to order production of a defense alibi witness, where the defense contended that the witness was under subpoena but no evidence was introduced to show that the witness was under subpoena, and no evidence was introduced to show the witness was ever served with a subpoena to testify.

Various states have a statutory provision to define the execution and regulation of subpoenas. Louisiana is typical. There the court made this statement: "A statute provides that the court shall issue subpoenas for the compulsory attendance of witnesses at hearings or trials when requested to do so by the state or the defendant."

One accused of a crime has a constitutional right to have compulsory process to procure the attendance of witnesses in his favor.

The subpoena is a process in the name of the court or a judge, carrying with it a command dignified by the sanction of the law.

A subpoena has been called a mandate lawfully issued under the seal of the court by a clerk thereof.

In general, the norm is to have the clerk of the court issue the subpoena for an upcoming trial in that same court.

Under the Uniform Rules of Criminal Procedure, a clerk or, someone acting in the part of the clerk of the court, under a magistrate shall issue a subpoena to a party requesting it, who shall fill in the blanks before it is served.

== Requisites of form in the United States ==
In the United States, the form of a subpoena may be prescribed by statute of the state, or by the rule of the local court.

A subpoena requires the person therein named to appear and attend before a court or magistrate at the time and place, to testify as a witness.

Under the Uniform Rules of Criminal Procedure, the subpoena must state the name of the court and the title, if any, of the proceeding. It must command each person to whom it is directed to attend and give testimony. The time and place must be specified.

The rules governing civil and criminal procedure in federal court provide for the subpoena of witnesses, and specify the form and requisites thereof.

== Appearance of writ, detainees, and prisoners as witnesses ==
In the American system there is a fundamental right to be heard in due process of law. This is defined in the Fourteenth Amendment of the United States Constitution. A necessary requisite of due process of law is the opportunity to be heard, in a manner which is meaningful, in front of a forum which has an open mind, and is willing to listen to evidence. Adequate notice and an opportunity to confront adverse witnesses must be afforded.

As a general rule, independent of statutory considerations, the writ of habeas corpus ad testificandum under American law may be resorted to for the purpose of removing a person confined in a jail or prison to enable him to testify as a witness. The issuance of such a writ lies within the sound discretion of the court, or the judicial officer having the power to compel the attendance of witnesses. Relevance and materiality are of consideration in such matters. The constitutional right of an accused to compulsory process for obtaining witnesses does not necessarily extend to compelling the attendance of person in prison. This right is not violated by a statute which makes the right to the production of a witness confined in prison upon the discretion of the court.

The Uniform Rendition of Prisoners as Witnesses in Criminal Proceedings Act provides by way of reciprocity between state for the summoning of a prisoner in one state to appear and testify as a witness in another. This is accomplished by way of a court order which specifies terms and conditions, and a determination and certification that the witness is material to a pending criminal proceeding. The Uniform Act defines a "witness" as a person who is confined in a penal institution in any state and whose testimony is desired in another state in any criminal proceeding or other investigation by a grand jury or in any criminal action before a court of law.

=== Compulsion to appear under statute ===
The subpoena power of any state court in the United States generally ends at that state's border. Consequently, lacking any powers outside the state's border, state prosecutors and defense attorneys in a state criminal case cannot use the same procedures that they would use to obtain a subpoena for an out-of-state witness that they would for an in-state witness.

A number of states have adopted the Uniform Act to Secure the Attendance of Witnesses from Without a State in Criminal Proceedings to enable courts, through voluntary co-operation, to secure the attendance of witnesses from other states. The co-operative states must have adopted the same legislation in order to enter into reciprocal agreements for the attendance of witnesses. The law also applies to grand jury investigations.

=== Federal Rule 4 ===
The issuance of process, including a summons, is regulated by local statutory provisions and rules of the court. These should be consulted. The usual procedure calls for the issuance of a summons by the clerk of the court upon filing a complaint or petition. The Federal Rules of Civil Procedure provides that upon filing of a complaint the clerk of the court must forthwith issue a summons and deliver the summons to the plaintiff or the plaintiff's attorney who is responsible for the prompt service of the summons and a copy of the complaint. (FRCP 4) The Federal Rule is not concerned with the amenability of the suit, the proper venue of the case, or the court's jurisdiction. The rule provides the means of invoking the in personam jurisdiction of the court in civil actions and will control if other relevant statutes or rules make no special provisions for service of process in other relevant statutes and rules. The nature of Rule 4 is procedural rather than substantive in nature.

=== Criminal process as ruse ===
In general, service of a process upon a non-resident will be set aside where the criminal proceedings are instituted against him in bad faith, or as a ruse or pretext for getting him into the jurisdiction in order to serve him with civil process.

== Immunity from subpoena service in civil cases ==
As a general rule, a witness who is in attendance at a trial in a state other than that of his residence is immune or privileged from the service of civil process (delivery of a subpoena in a civil case, but not a criminal case) while in such a state. Usually, immunity is granted to a witness who voluntarily appears to testify for the benefit of another, but it has also been held that the grant of immunity is not affected by the fact that the witness appearance was pursuant to a court order. The immunity is not affected by the witness' domination of a corporate defendant already in action, or the witness' potential liability as a co-defendant. A witness who appears in court as part of his official duties is immune from service of civil process, and it is irrelevant that his appearance was not under subpoena.

Contrary to the general rule, there has been opinion that non-resident witnesses are not exempt from civil process. Many courts encourage witnesses to come forward voluntarily and give testimony.

Immunity is based on the theory that the court must be unimpeded in its goals, and fear of service could lead to witnesses not appearing, for fear of being served in another pending civil case.

There are two general rules followed:

1. The "sole purpose rule" where the rule cannot be invoked unless the only reason the party is in the jurisdiction is to attend the court's business.
2. The "controlling reason doctrine", which is more liberal, and allows a person testifying more latitude. So called "long-arm statutes" have tended to mitigate immunity to some extent.

Various "long-arm statutes" have changed the landscape of civil service across state lines. For instance, immunity from civil service to non-resident witnesses no longer applies in California after Silverman v. Superior Court 203 Cal. App. 3d 145 (Cal. Ct. App. 1988).

== Subpoena power defined in the Federal Administrative Procedure Act ==
Following the United States Supreme Court ruling in Morgan v. United States (1938), federal administrative law was ripe for significant reform. Administrative law had grown significantly during the Franklin Delano Roosevelt administration and the implementation of the numerous agencies promulgated under the New Deal. The decision in Morgan precipitated change in the federal system which had been deemed inadequate for the previous thirty five years. In 1941 the United States Attorney General's Committee presented its final report on federal administrative procedure. The report resulted in the Federal Administrative Procedure Act of 1946 (APA). A parallel report entitled the Benjamin Report was issued concerning administrative adjudication in the state of New York in 1942. The Federal Administrative Procedure Act of 1946 required hearings to have the qualities defined in §§ 553 and 554: For hearings involved in the taking of evidence, there shall preside:

1. The agency
2. One or more members of the body which comprises the agency; and
3. One or more hearing examiners appointed under section 3105.

Subject to published rules of the agency and within its power, employees presiding at hearings may -

1. Administer oaths and affirmations;
2. Issue subpoenas authorized by law;
3. Rule on offers of proof and receive relevant evidence;
4. Take depositions or have depositions taken when the ends of justice would be served;
5. Regulate the course of the hearing;
6. Hold conferences for the settlement or simplification of the issues by consent of the parties;
7. Dispose of procedural requests or similar matters;
8. Make or recommend decisions in accordance with section 557 of the title;
9. Create a transcript of the testimony and exhibits, together with all papers and requests filed in the proceeding, constitutes the exclusive record for the decision in accordance with § 557 of the title. Upon payment of lawfully prescribed costs, the transcript shall be made available to the parties involved. When the agency decision rests on official notice of a material fact not appearing in the evidence in the record, a party is entitled on timely request to an opportunity to show contrary. In the years following the enactment of the Administrative Act, hearing officers have had their titles and positions changed to Administrative Law Judge. This was done by Civil Service Commission and not by an act of Congress. This change is arguably important to lend credence to the authority to issue subpoenas for administrative procedures.

From the Federal Administrative Procedure Act, 5 U.S.C. § 555 (b): "A person compelled to appear in person before an agency or representative thereof is entitled to be accompanied, represented, and advised by counsel or, if permitted by the agency, by other qualified representative. A party is entitled to appear in person or by, or with counsel in an agency hearing."

In Madera v. Board of Education, 1967, the United States Supreme Court ruled that administrative hearings which complied with the requirements of due process must allow counsel. In Powell v. Alabama, 1938, the Supreme Court ruled that in criminal proceedings, the accused must be provided counsel at public expense, if the defendant cannot afford one. It is not required that representation in administrative hearings be paid for by public funds. Some hearings require that counsel cannot participate, as in arguing the case, but may only advise the client.

When the APA applies, the agency due process hearing must be presided over by the agency head (or one or more of the commissioners or board members, if it is a multiheaded agency) or an administrative law judge. The APA states that is provision requiring hearings by agency heads of administrative law judges, "does not supersede the conduct of specified classes or proceedings... by or before boards or other employees specially provided for by or designed under statute." The most prominent use of this clause is the Immigration and Naturalization Service.

In general, one called to be a witness by subpoena issued under APA guidelines is entitled to have representation by an attorney. This is not uniform, however. The Supreme Court has held that there is no constitutional right to counsel in noncriminal investigatory proceedings. Even the blanket right to counsel given by APA may not apply to all agencies. The Internal Revenue Service and the Securities and Exchange Commission have sought to restrict the right of person called as witnesses in investigatory proceedings to engage lawyers who appear as counsel for someone else in the hearing. The courts have been ambivalent in their reaction to such attempts to restrict the choice of counsel. One case holds that person required to testify in a tax investigation are not entitled to counsel connected with or retained by the taxpayer whose liability is under investigation.

== Important Supreme Court cases ==
=== Goldberg v. Kelly ===
In the case of Goldberg v. Kelly, 397 U.S. 254 (1970) decided March 23, 1970, the Supreme Court considered the issue of New York City residents receiving financial aid under Aid to Families with Dependent Children or the New York State general Home Relief Program who had brought suit challenging the adequacy of procedures for notice and hearing in connection with the termination of such aid. The three judges in the U.S. District Court for Southern New York entered judgment in favor of the plaintiffs. The defendant appealed. The United States Supreme Court ruled that procedural due process requires that a predetermination evidentiary hearing be held when public assistance payments were to be discontinued. The procedures followed by New York were constitutionally inadequate in that they failed to permit recipients to appear personally with or without counsel before the official who finally decided the continued eligibility and failing to permit recipient to present evidence to that official orally or to confront or cross-examine adverse witnesses. Welfare benefits are a matter of statutory entitlement for persons qualified to receive them and their termination involves state action that adjudicates important rights, and procedural due process to termination of welfare benefits.

== See also ==
- Continuance
- Henry Charles Lea
- List of Latin phrases
- Long-arm jurisdiction
- Subpoena
