= Interrogatories =

Civil procedure in the US

In law, interrogatories (also known as requests for further information) are a formal set of written questions propounded by one litigant and required to be answered by an adversary in order to clarify matters of fact and help to determine in advance what facts will be presented at any trial in the case.

== Use ==
Interrogatories are used to gain information from the other party relevant to the issues in a lawsuit. The law and issues will differ depending upon the facts of a case and the laws of the jurisdiction in which a lawsuit is filed. For some types of cases there are standard sets of interrogatories available that cover the essential facts, and may be modified for the case in which they are used.

When a lawsuit is filed, the pleadings filed by the parties are intended to let the other parties know what each side intends to prove at trial, and what legal case they have to answer. However, in most cases, the parties will require additional information to fully understand each other's legal and factual claims. The discovery process, including the use of interrogatories, can help the parties obtain that information from each other.

For an example of how interrogatories may be used, in a motor vehicle accident lawsuit, an injured plaintiff typically asserts that the defendant driver committed the tort of negligence in causing the accident. To prove negligence, the law requires the injured plaintiff to show that the driver owed them a duty of care and breached it, causing the injury. Assuming that the defendant did not dispute driving a vehicle that was involved in the accident that injured the plaintiff, the case would come down to whether the driver drove in accordance with the standard of a reasonable driver, and whether the injured person's injuries are a foreseeable consequence of the driving.

The parties may use interrogatories to seek information, including concessions as to how the accident occurred, from each other. The injured plaintiff might serve interrogatories on the defendant driver seeking information that would support the plaintiff's theory of the case. If the plaintiff is alleging that the defendant was speeding, the plaintiff might ask the defendant to state the speed of the defendant's vehicle at the time of the accident. If the plaintiff alleges that the defendant failed to control the car properly or failed to pay proper attention to the road and other vehicles, the plaintiff could ask interrogatory questions that would help prove those allegations or require disclosure of the basis of any denial of negligence by the defendant. The driver may have a defense to those allegations, perhaps if the accident occurred at low speed, and was unavoidable (maybe due to some third party intervention). The injured person may, however, argue that the driver was still responsible (perhaps the driver should have used the horn of the vehicle to alert the third party), or there may be other allegations.

The defense may similarly use interrogatories to help build legal and factual defenses to the plaintiff's case. Continuing with the example of a car accident, the defendant may seek information or concessions from the plaintiff that would suggest that a different driver was partially or wholly responsible for the accident, or that under the facts the accident was unavoidable despite the proper exercise of care.

== Specific jurisdictions ==
=== England and Wales ===
In England and Wales, this procedure is governed by Part 18 of the Civil Procedure Rules. It is known as a Request for Further Information.

In the Request for Further Information procedure, use of standard pre-printed forms is not common, and any such request would almost certainly be looked upon critically by the courts, as use of standard forms rather than requests tailored specifically to the case is likely to offend against the 'Overriding Objective' in that it is unlikely to be proportionate to the case, and instead result in the parties or their lawyers having to spend time, money and resources in answering the questions. The way the rules work, this could easily result in the party making the request having to pay both their own costs and the costs of the opponent - even if they win the case at the end.

In England and Wales, firstly the person wanting to know the information requests it in writing, either in letter form or, more usually, on a blank document with the questions on one side of the page and space for the answers on the other side. A deadline is set for the opponent to answer the request. If they fail to answer, the person requesting can make an Application on Notice to the court and ask the procedural judge to make an order compelling the opponent to answer the questions. Whether the judge will make an order is discretionary and will be determined in accordance with the overriding objective, and in the context of the questions asked.

In particular, the procedure is not intended to be used to ask questions that would ordinarily be dealt with at trial.

=== United States ===
In the United States, use of interrogatories is governed by the law where the case has been filed. All federal courts operate under the Federal Rules of Civil Procedure, which places various limitations on the use of this device, permitting individual jurisdictions to limit interrogatories to twenty-five questions per party. Interrogatories are typically "verified", meaning that the response will include an affidavit and will therefore be under oath. The affidavit may distinguish interrogatories from requests for admission, which are not normally answered under oath.

California, on the other hand, operates under the Civil Discovery Act of 1986 (a revision of an older 1957 act), which is codified in the California Code of Civil Procedure. The Discovery Act allows up to thirty-five specially prepared interrogatories per party, but this limit may be exceeded simply by executing and serving a declaration of necessity with the interrogatories. However, because the declaration of necessity must be executed under penalty of perjury, it can expose an attorney to personal sanctions for propounding an excessive number of harassing and burdensome interrogatories.

In nearly all U.S. jurisdictions, interrogatories are called just that and are supposed to be custom-written, although many questions can be reused from one case to the next. In the U.S. states of California, New Jersey, and Florida, the courts have promulgated standard "form" interrogatories. In California these come on an official court form promulgated by the Judicial Council of California and a party may ask another party to answer any of them by checking the appropriate boxes. The advantage of the California form interrogatories is that they do not count against the limit of 35 (except when used in limited civil cases); the disadvantage is that they are written in a very generic fashion, so about half of the questions are useful only in the simplest cases. In turn, California calls custom-written interrogatories "specially prepared interrogatories."

Because interrogatories are so heavily used in American discovery, there are two major compilations of generic interrogatories covering almost every conceivable type of legal case: Bender's Forms of Discovery: Interrogatories (published by LexisNexis) and Pattern Discovery (published by West).

== See also ==
- Inspection of documents
- Subpoena duces tecum
- Subpoena ad testificandum
- Request for admissions
