= Federal Rules of Civil Procedure =

Rules that govern civil procedure in United States district courts

The Federal Rules of Civil Procedure (officially abbreviated Fed. R. Civ. P.; colloquially FRCP) govern civil procedure in United States district courts. They are the companion to the Federal Rules of Criminal Procedure. Rules promulgated by the United States Supreme Court pursuant to the Rules Enabling Act become part of the FRCP unless, within seven months, the United States Congress acts to veto them. The Court's modifications to the rules are usually based upon recommendations from the Judicial Conference of the United States, the federal judiciary's internal policy-making body.

At the time 28 U.S.C. § 724 (1934) was adopted, federal courts were generally required to follow the procedural rules of the states in which they sat, but they were free to apply federal common law in cases not governed by a state constitution or state statute. Whether within the intent of Congress or not when adopting 28 U.S.C. 724 (1934), the situation was effectively reversed in 1938, the year the Federal Rules of Civil Procedure took effect. Federal courts are now required to apply the substantive law of the states as rules of decision in cases where state law is in question, including state judicial decisions, and the federal courts almost always are required to use the FRCP as their rules of civil procedure. States may determine their own rules, which apply in state courts, although 35 of the 50 states have adopted rules that are based on the FRCP.

== History ==
The Rules, established in 1938, replaced the earlier procedures under the Federal Equity Rules and the Conformity Act (28 U.S.C. 724 (1934)), merging the procedure for cases at law and in equity. The Conformity Act required that procedures in suits at law conform to state practice, usually the Field Code or a pleading system based on common law.

Before the FRCP were established, common-law pleading was more formal, traditional, and particular in its phrases and requirements. For example, a plaintiff bringing a trespass suit would have to mention certain key words in his complaint or risk having it dismissed with prejudice. In contrast, the FRCP is based upon a legal construction called notice pleading, which is less formal, is created and modified by legal experts, and is less technical in requirements. In notice pleading, the same plaintiff bringing suit would not face dismissal for lack of the exact legal term, as long as the claim itself was legally actionable. The policy behind this change is to simply give "notice" of grievances and to leave the details for later in the case. This acts in the interest of equity by concentrating on the actual law rather than the exact construction of pleas.

The Field Code, which was adopted between 1848 and 1850, was an intermediate step between common law and modern rules, created by New York attorney David Dudley Field. The Field Code was partially inspired by civil law systems in Europe and Louisiana, and among other reforms, merged law and equity proceedings. In 1935, the Supreme Court appointed Charles Edward Clark as the Reporter to the Advisory Committee on Rules for Civil Procedure. The rules that Committee proposed became the Federal Rules of Civil Procedure in 1938. The Supreme Court has described Clark as "the principal draftsman" of the Rules.

Significant revisions have been made to the FRCP in 1948, 1963, 1966, 1970, 1980, 1983, 1987, 1993, 2000, and 2006. The FRCP contains a notes section that details the changes of each revision since 1938, explaining the rationale behind the language.

The 1966 amendments to the FRCP unified the civil and admiralty procedure, and added the Supplemental Rules for Certain Admiralty and Maritime Claims, now Supplemental Rules for Admiralty or Maritime Claims and Asset Forfeiture Actions.

The revisions that took effect in December 2006 made practical changes to discovery rules to make it easier for courts and litigating parties to manage electronic records.

The FRCP were rewritten with respect to style, effective December 1, 2007, under the leadership of law professor and editor of Black's Law Dictionary Bryan A. Garner, for the avowed purpose of making them easier to understand. The style amendments were not intended to make substantive changes in the rules.

Effective December 1, 2009, substantial amendments were made to rules 6, 12, 13, 14, 15, 23, 27, 32, 38, 48, 50, 52, 53, 54, 55, 56, 59, 62, 65, 68, 71.1, 72 and 81. While rules 48 and 62.1 were added. Rule 1(f) was abrogated. The majority of the amendments affect various timing requirements and change how some deadlines are calculated. The most significant changes are to Rule 6.

The FRCP does not apply to civil actions centralized into multidistrict litigations (MDLs), which have grown from a small minority of federal civil cases to the majority of them. At the end of 2018, for the first time, more than half of all pending federal civil actions had been centralized into MDLs. In other words, over half of all federal civil actions were not being litigated under the FRCP, but under ad hoc procedures crafted by federal district judges to manage complex civil litigation. In response to these developments, many attorneys representing both plaintiffs and defendants have argued that the FRCP should be amended to expressly address the unique requirements of MDLs.

== Titles of Rules ==
There are 87 rules in the FRCP, which are grouped into 11 titles. There are also two separate supplemental rules governing certain actions under admiralty law (Rules B-F) and civil forfeiture (Rule G); and for individual social security actions (Supplemental Rules 1-8).

Listed below are the most commonly used categories and rules.

=== Title I – Scope of the FRCP ===
Rules 1 and 2.

Title I states goals for the FRCP. Rule 1 states that the rules "shall be construed and administered to secure the just, speedy, and inexpensive determination of every action." Rule 2 unifies the procedure of law and equity in the federal courts by specifying that there shall be one form of action, the "civil action".

=== Title II – Commencement of Suits ===
Rules 3 to 6.

Title II covers commencement of civil suits and includes filing, summons, and service of process. Rule 3 provides that a civil action is commenced by filing a complaint with the court. Rule 4 deals with procedure for issuance of a summons, when the complaint is filed, and for the service of the summons and complaint on the defendants. Rule 5 requires that all papers in an action be served on all parties and be filed with the court. Rule 6 deals with technical issues, which concern the computation of time, and authorizes the courts to extend certain deadlines in appropriate circumstances.

=== Title III – Pleadings and Motions ===
Rules 7 to 16.

Title III covers pleadings, motions, defenses, and counterclaims. The plaintiff's original pleading is called a complaint. The defendant's original pleading is called an answer.

Rule 8(a) sets out the plaintiff's requirements for a claim: a "short and plain statement" of jurisdiction, a "short and plain statement" of the claim, and a demand for judgment. It also allows relief in the alternative, so the plaintiff does not have to pre-guess the remedy most likely to be accepted by the court.

Rule 8(b) states that the defendant's answer must admit or deny every element of the plaintiff's claim.

Rule 8(c) requires that the defendant's answer must state any affirmative defenses.

Rule 8(d) maintains that each allegation be "simple, concise, and direct" but allows "2 or more statements of a claim or defense alternatively or hypothetically." If a party makes alternative statements, the pleading is sufficient if any one of them is sufficient. A party may state inconsistent (even mutually exclusive) claims or defenses.

In addition to notice pleading, a minority of states (e.g., California) use an intermediate system known as code pleading, which is a system older than notice pleading and which is based upon legislative statute. It tends to straddle the gulf between obsolete common-law pleading and modern notice pleading. Code pleading places additional burdens on a party to plead the "ultimate facts" of its case, laying out the party's entire case and the facts or allegations underlying it. Notice pleading, by contrast, simply requires a "short and plain statement" showing only that the pleader is entitled to relief (FRCP 8(a)(2)). One important exception to this rule is that, when a party alleges fraud or mistake, it must plead the facts of the alleged fraud "with particularity" (FRCP 9(b)).

Rule 10 describes what information should be in the caption (the front page) of a pleading, but does not explain how such information should actually be organized in the caption. The FRCP is notoriously vague on how papers should be formatted. Most of the details missing from the FRCP are to be found in local rules promulgated by each district court and in general orders by each individual federal judge. For example, federal courts in some of the West Coast states require line numbers on the left margin on all filings (to match local practice in the courts of the states in which they sit), but most other federal courts do not.

Rule 11 requires all papers to be signed by the attorney (if party is represented). It also provides for sanctions against the attorney or client for harassment, frivolous arguments, or a lack of factual investigation. The purpose of sanctions is deterrent, not punitive. Courts have broad discretion about the exact nature of the sanction, which can include consent to in personam jurisdiction, fines, dismissal of claims, or dismissal of the entire case. The current version of Rule 11 is more lenient than its 1983 version. Supporters of tort reform in Congress regularly call for legislation to make Rule 11 stricter.

Rule 12(b) describes pretrial motions that can be filed.

1. lack of subject matter jurisdiction
2. lack of personal jurisdiction
3. improper venue
4. insufficient process
5. insufficient service of process
6. failure to state a claim upon which relief can be granted; and
7. failure to join a party under Rule 19

A Rule 12(b)(6) motion, which replaced the common law demurrer, is how a lawsuit with insufficient legal theory underlying its cause of action is dismissed from court. For example, assault requires intent, so if the plaintiff has failed to plead intent, the defense can seek dismissal by filing a 12(b)(6) motion. "While a complaint attacked by a Rule 12(b)(6) motion to dismiss does not need detailed factual allegations, a plaintiff's obligation to provide the grounds of his entitlement to relief requires more than labels and conclusions, and a formulaic recitation of the elements of a cause of action will not do. Factual allegations must be enough to raise a right to relief above the speculative level, on the assumption that all the allegations in the complaint are true (even if doubtful in fact)." Bell Atlantic Corp. v. Twombly, 550 U.S. 544, 127 S.Ct. 1955 (No. 05-1126) (2007) (citations, internal quotation marks and footnote omitted). Federal court rules require a court to accept "all well-pleaded allegations" as true and to construe the factual allegations in the light most favorable to the plaintiff, so as to focus its review of a Rule 12(b)(6) motion on testing the legal sufficiency of the complaint.

Rule 12(b)(6) is the second of three procedural "hurdles" a cause of action must surmount before it gets to a trial (the first are the two jurisdictional dismissals, found in 12 (b)(1) and (2), and the third is summary judgment, found in Rule 56). A Rule 12(b)(6) motion cannot include additional evidence such as affidavits. To dispose of claims with insufficient factual basis (where the movant must submit additional facts to demonstrate the factual weakness in the plaintiff's case), a Rule 56 motion for summary judgment is used.

Rule 12(e) is a Motion for more definite statement.

Rules 12(g) and 12(h) are also important because they state that if 12(b)(2)-12(b)(5) motions are not properly bundled together or included in an answer/allowable amendment to an answer, they are waived. Additionally, because 12(b)(1) motions are so fundamental, they may never be waived throughout the course of litigation, and 12(b)(6) and 12(b)(7) motions may be filed at any time until trial ends.

Rule 13 describes when a defendant is allowed or required to assert claims against other parties to the suit (joinder). The law encourages people to resolve all their differences as efficiently as possible; consequently, in many jurisdictions, counterclaims (claims against an opposing party) that arise out of the same transaction or occurrence (compulsory counterclaims) must be brought during the original suit, or they will be barred from future litigation (preclusion). Any counterclaims may be brought, even if they are not compulsory (permissive counterclaims), however a crossclaim (claims against a coparty), while not compulsory, must arise out of the same transaction or occurrence of the original suit or a counterclaim, or it must relate to the property in the original suit.

Rule 14 allows parties to bring in other third parties to a lawsuit.

Rule 15 allows pleadings to be amended or supplemented. Plaintiffs may amend once before an answer is filed, a defendant can amend once within 21 days of serving an answer. If there is no right to amend, a party may seek leave of the court: "The court should freely give leave when justice so requires" (FRCP 15(a){2)).

=== Title IV – Parties ===
Rules 17 to 25.

Rule 17 states that all actions must be prosecuted in the name of the real party in interest, that is, the plaintiff must be person or entity whose rights are at issue in the case.

Rule 18 – Joinder of Claims and Remedies – states that a plaintiff who may plead in a single civil action as many claims as the plaintiff has against a defendant, even if the claims are not related, and may request any remedy to which the law entitles the plaintiff. Of course, each claim must have its own basis for jurisdiction in the court in which it is brought or be subject to dismissal.

Rule 19 – Compulsory Joinder of Parties – if a person who is not a party to the suit is "necessary" to just adjudication of the action, under the criteria set forth in subsection (a), then upon motion of any party that person shall be made a party, served with suit, and required to participate in the action. If the person cannot be made a party for any reason, such as lack of jurisdiction, inability to be located, etc., then the court uses the criteria in subsection (b) to determine if the absent party is "indispensable". If so, the action must be dismissed.

Rule 20 Permissive Joinder of Parties. Joinder of parties at common law was controlled by the substantive rules of law, often as reflected in the forms of action, rather than by notions of judicial economy and trial convenience. Permissive joinder of plaintiffs allows the plaintiffs having an option to join their claims when they were not joint. (Ryder v. Jefferson Hotel Co.)

Rule 22 governs the procedure for interpleader. It allows an interpleader to be brought by a plaintiff who is subject to multiple liability even though 1. the claims or title they are based on lack common origin, are independent and averse and 2. the plaintiff denies any of the claims in whole or part. A defendant exposed to similar liability may also seek interpleader.

Rule 23 governs the procedure for class action litigation. In a class action, a single plaintiff or small group of plaintiffs seeks to proceed on behalf of an entire class who have been harmed by the same conduct by the same defendants; actions against classes of defendants are also theoretically permitted. Court approval is required for this procedure to be used. Rule 23.1 governs derivative suits in which a plaintiff seeks to assert a right belonging to a corporation (or similar entity) in which the plaintiff is a shareholder, on behalf of the corporation that is not pursuing the claim itself. Rule 23.2 governs actions by or against unincorporated associations.

=== Title V – Discovery ===
Rules 26 to 37.

Title V covers the rules of discovery. Modern civil litigation is based upon the idea that the parties should not be subject to surprises at trial. Discovery is the process whereby civil litigants seek to obtain information both from other parties and from non parties (or third parties). Parties have a series of tools with which they can obtain information:

1. Document requests (Rule 34): a party can seek documents and other real objects from parties and non parties
2. Interrogatories (Rule 33): a party can require other parties to answer 25 questions
3. Requests for admissions (Rule 36): A party can require other parties to admit or deny the truth of certain statements
4. Depositions (Rule 30): A party can require at most 10 individuals or representatives of organizations to make themselves available for questioning for a maximum of one day of 7 hours, without obtaining leave of court.

FRCP Rule 37 oversees the possible sanctions that someone may seek if a failure to preserve data takes place and outlines how courts may apply sanctions or remedial measures (including such terminating sanctions as dismissal or entry of default judgment). Updates to FRCP Rule 37 went into effect on December 1, 2015, and have led to a significant decline in spoliation rulings in subsequent years.

Federal procedure also requires parties to divulge certain information without a formal discovery request, in contrast to many state courts where most discovery can only be had by request. Information covered by this initial disclosure is found in Rule 26(a)(1)(A), includes information about potential witnesses, information/copies about all documents that may be used in the party's claim (excluding impeachment material), computations of damages, and insurance information. Information about any expert witness testimony is also required.

Notable exceptions to the discovery rules include impeachment evidence/witnesses, "work product" (materials an attorney uses to prepare for the trial especially documents containing mental impressions, legal conclusions, or opinions of counsel), and experts who are used exclusively for trial prep and will not testify.

FRCP Rule 26 provides general guidelines to the discovery process, it requires the plaintiff to initiate a conference between the parties to plan the discovery process. The parties must confer as soon as practicable after the complaint was served to the defendants—and in any event at least 21 days before a scheduling conference is to be held or a scheduling order is due under Rule 16(b). The parties should attempt to agree on the proposed discovery plan, and submit it to the court within 14 days after the conference. The Discovery Plan must state the parties' proposals on subject of the discovery, limitations on discovery, case management schedule and timing deadlines for each stage of the discovery process, including:

- End-date of the discovery. This should be at least 60 days before the trial. The trial target date is usually 6 months to 2 years after the conference.
- Amendments to the deadlines for filing pleadings under FRCP 7&15, if any.
- Deadline for amending pleadings. Normally it is at least 30 days before the discovery ends.
- Deadline for joining claims, remedies and parties (FRCP 18&19). Normally it is at least 30 days before the discovery ends.
- Deadline for initial expert disclosures and rebuttal expert disclosures. Normally it is at least 30 days before the discovery ends.
- Deadline for dispositive motions. Usually it is at least 30 days after the discovery end-date.
- Deadline for Pre-trial order. If any dispositive motions are filed, the Joint Pretrial Order can be filed at least 30 days after the last decision on the merits.

Unless all parties agree otherwise, the parties should submit to each other the initial disclosures under Rule 26(a) within 14 days after the conference. Only after the initial disclosures have been sent, the main discovery process begins which includes: depositions, interrogatories, request for admissions (RFA) and request for production of documents (RFP). As stated above, there is a limitation on number of interrogatories and depositions, but there is no limitation on RFAs and RFPs. Some states, like California, have different limitations set in their Local Rules. FRCP requires that the party to whom the request for Interrogatories, RFA or RFP is directed must respond in writing within 30 days after being served, otherwise the requestor can file a motion to compel discovery and for sanctions.

=== Title VI – Trial ===
Rules 38 to 53.

Title VI deals generally with the trial of civil actions, although some other topics are also included. Rules 38 and 39 deal with the parties' right to a trial by jury and the procedure for requesting a jury trial instead of a bench trial and trials by an advisory jury. These rules must be construed in light of the Seventh Amendment to the United States Constitution, which preserves a right to jury trial in most actions at common law (as opposed to equity cases). Rule 40 deals in general terms with the order in which cases will be scheduled for trial and has little significance in practice.

Rule 41 deals with dismissal of actions. An action may be voluntarily dismissed at any time by the plaintiff prior to the defendant's filing of an Answer or Motion for Summary Judgment. In such an instance, the court retains jurisdiction only to award attorneys fees or costs (in rare circumstances). With certain exceptions (e.g. class actions), an action may also be dismissed at any time by agreement of the parties (e.g. when the parties reach a settlement). An action may also be involuntarily dismissed by the court if the plaintiff fails to comply with deadlines or court orders.

Rule 42 deals with consolidation of related cases or the holding of separate trials. Rule 43 addresses the taking of testimony, which is to be taken in open court whenever possible. Rule 44 governs authentication of official records.

Rule 45 deals with subpoenas. A subpoena commands a person to give testimony, to produce documents for inspection and copying, or both. Although included in the Chapter headed "trials", subpoenas can also be used to obtain document production or depositions of non-parties to the litigation during the pre-trial discovery stage.

Rule 46 provides that formal "exceptions" to court rulings are no longer necessary so long as a sufficient record is made of the objecting party's position.

The next several rules govern jury trials. Rule 47 provides for the selection of jurors and rule 48 governs the number of jurors in a civil case. A civil jury must consist of between six and twelve jurors (six jurors are presently used in the vast majority of federal civil trials; juries of twelve are still required in federal criminal cases). Rule 49 provides for use of "special verdicts" in jury trials, under which the jury may be asked to respond to specific questions rather than just finding liability or non-liability and determining the amount of the damages, if any. Rule 50 addresses situations in which a case is so one-sided that the court may grant "judgment as a matter of law" taking the case from the jury. Rule 51 governs jury instructions.

Rule 52 provides procedure for the judge to hand down findings and conclusions following non-jury trials. Rule 53 governs masters, who are typically lawyers designated by the court to act as neutrals and assist the court in a case.

=== Title VII – Judgment ===
Rules 54 to 63.

Rule 56 deals with summary judgment. It is considered the last gate-keeping function before trial, answering the question of whether the claim could go to a jury. A successful summary judgment motion persuades the court there is no "genuine issue of material fact" and also that the moving party is "entitled to judgment as a matter of law."

The moving party can show that the disputed factual issues are illusory, can show a lack of genuine issue by producing affidavits or can make a showing through discovery. The movant can point either to the other side's inadequacies or can affirmatively negate the claim.

The moving party has the burden of production; it has to come up with evidence that there is no genuine issue of material fact. Then the burden shifts to the non-moving party, which has to show that the claim is adequate to let it get to the jury. The non-movant can submit affidavits, depositions, and other material.

The burden shifts again to the moving party, which must say that there is still no genuine issue of material fact. A court grants summary judgment when there is no way the movant can lose at trial. When the moving party is the plaintiff, then it has to show that there is no way that a jury could find against it.

A partial summary judgment usually pertains only to certain claims, not the whole case.

Rule 50 also deals with judgments as a matter of law, however Rule 50 decisions take place after a jury has been empanelled. A motion under Rule 50(a) generally takes place immediately after the opposing party has finished presenting its case and must take place before the case is submitted to the jury. Importantly, to keep open the option of moving for a "judgment notwithstanding the verdict", or "judgment non obstante verdicto" after the jury has returned a verdict, one must file a Rule 50(a) motion. Under the Federal Rules of Civil Procedure, the two are not separate motions, the JNOV motion is simply a renewed Rule 50(a) motion. A renewed 50(a) motion must be filed within 28 days of verdict entry.

Rule 50 also covers motions for a new trial. These motions can be granted, denied, conditionally granted, or conditionally denied. Conditional grants or denials cover what will happen if the case is reversed on appeal. For instance, a case that ends with a successfully renewed Rule 50(a) motion to overturn the jury verdict may also include a conditional grant of a new trial. If the losing party wins their appeal, the trial will start over again. A motion for a new trial is a Rule 59(a)(1) motion and is generally filed simultaneously and as an alternative to a renewal of a Rule 50(a) motion.

=== Title VIII – Provisional and Final Remedies ===
Rules 64 to 71.

This Title deals with remedies that may be granted by a federal court – both provisional remedies that may be ordered while the action is pending as well as final relief that may be granted to the winning party at the end of the case.

Rule 64 is captioned "Seizure of Person or Property" and authorizes procedures such as Prejudgment attachment, replevin, and garnishment. In general, these remedies may be awarded when they would be authorized under the law of the state in which the federal court is located – a rare instance in which the Federal Rules of Civil Procedure, generally designed to promote uniformity of practice in the federal districts throughout the country, defer to state law.

Rule 65 governs the procedure on applications for preliminary injunctions and temporary restraining orders.

Rule 65.1 addresses security and suretyship issues arising when the court orders a party to deposit security such as a bond.

Rule 66 deals with receivership.

Rule 67 deals with funds deposited in court, such as in interpleader actions.

Rule 68 governs the offer of judgment procedure under which a party may make a confidential offer of settlement in an action for money damages.

Rules 69 and 70 deal with execution of judgments and orders directing a party to take a specific act. Rule 71 deals with the effect of judgments on persons who are not parties to the action.

=== Title IX – Special Proceedings ===
Rules 71.1 to 76.

Chapter IX deals with special types of litigation that may take place in the federal courts. A former version of Chapter IX, contained in the original Rules of Civil Procedure, dealt with appeals from a District Court to a United States Court of Appeals. These rules were abrogated in 1967 when they were superseded by the Federal Rules of Appellate Procedure, a separate set of rules specifically governing the Courts of Appeals.

Rule 71.1 deals with procedure in condemnation actions.

Rule 72 sets forth procedures for matters before United States magistrate judges, including both "dispositive" and "nondispositive" matters, and provides for review of the magistrate judge's decision by a District Judge.

Rule 73 provides that magistrate judges may preside over certain trials consistent with statute and upon the consent of all parties.

At present, there are no rules numbered 74 through 76.

=== Title X. District Courts and Clerks: Conducting Business; Issuing Orders ===
Rules 77 to 80

=== Title XI. General Provisions ===
Rules 81 to 87

=== Title XII – Supplemental Rules for Admiralty or Maritime Claims and Asset Forfeiture Actions ===
Rule A outlines the scope and application of the supplementary rules in respect to certain remedies under admiralty and maritime claims, forfeiture actions in rem, and the procedure in statutory condemnation proceedings analogous to maritime actions.

Rule B deals with attachment and garnishment in in personam actions.

Rule C applies to actions in rem to enforce maritime liens or pursuant to federal statute which provides for a maritime actions in rem.

Rule D deals with possessory, petitory, and partition actions in admiralty actions.

Rule E applies to actions in personam with process of maritime attachment and garnishment, actions in rem, and petitory, possessory, and partition actions.

Rule F relates to limitation of liability actions in relation to vessel owners.

Rule G deals with forfeiture actions in rem arising from federal statute.

=== Title XIII - Supplemental Rules For Social Security Actions Under 42 U.S.C § 405(g) ===
Supplemental rules 1-8 of this title deals specifically with actions challenging a final decision of the Commissioner of Social Security on an individual claim; most other rules in the FRCP apply to the extent they’re not inconsistent with these rules.

Rules 2-4 concern pre-briefing actions. The lawsuit is commenced with a plaintiff filing a complaint bringing an action under §405(g) and that states other contents regarding personal information of benefits. The Commissioner must then be notified by the court via electronic service, eliminating the need for rule 4 service of process. The Commissioner need not admit or deny statements under rule 8(b), but must file an answer, and may file any other defense under rule 8(c) or motion to dismiss under rule 12(b) within 60 days of notice by the court. The answer mainly consists of the plaintiff's administrative record in the Department of Social Security.

Rules 5-8 deals with presenting briefs in support of an action for a decision. In a similar vein to an appeal, each side files briefs in support or opposition of all factual assertions of the plaintiffs record in the Department of Social Security. A judge may then issue a judgment accordingly. This overall results in a simpler procedure that accommodates the appellate nature of a §405(g) actions.

== See also ==
- Foman v. Davis
- Subpoena duces tecum
- Subpoena ad testificandum
