= Party (law) =

Person or group composing a single entity for law purposes

A party is an individual or group of individuals that compose a single entity which can be identified as one for law purposes.

== Parties to litigation ==
Parties include:

- plaintiff (person filing suit),
- defendant (person sued or charged with a crime),
- petitioner (files a petition asking for a court ruling),
- respondent (usually in opposition to a petition or an appeal),
- cross-complainant (a defendant who sues someone else in the same lawsuit), or
- cross-defendant (a person sued by a cross-complainant).

A person who only appears in the case as a witness is not considered a party.

Courts use various terms to identify the role of a particular party in civil litigation, usually identifying the party that brings a lawsuit as the plaintiff, or, in older American cases, the party of the first part; and the party against whom the case was brought as the defendant, or, in older American cases, the party of the second part. In a criminal case in Nigeria and some other countries the parties are called prosecutor and defendant.

== See also ==
- Erga omnes
- Ex parte proceeding
- Inter partes proceeding
- Intervention (law)
- Real party in interest
