= Professional privilege =

Professional privilege may refer to rights to maintain confidentiality in various professions and jurisdictions:

- Accountant–client privilege in the United States
- Legal professional privilege:
  - Legal professional privilege (Common Law)
  - Legal professional privilege (Australia)
  - Legal professional privilege (England & Wales)
  - Attorney–client privilege (United States)
- Physician–patient privilege

== See also ==
- Priest–penitent privilege
