= PwC tax scandal =

Scandal involving firm PwC

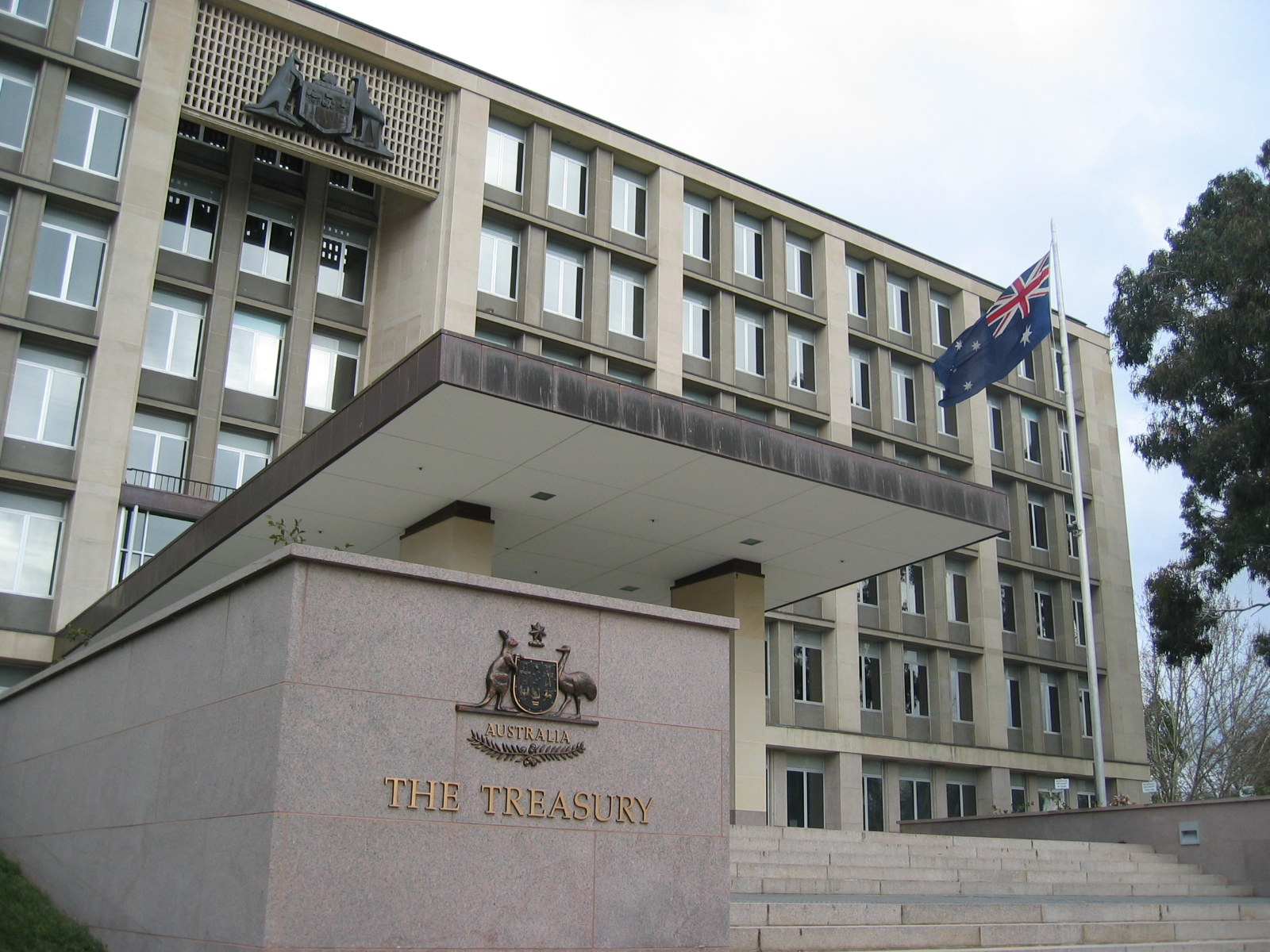
The Treasury Building, Canberra

The PwC tax scandal was a scandal involving PwC's abuse of the Australian Government's secrets to enrich itself and its corporate clients.

PwC, and other Big Four accounting firms, give advice to governments on writing tax law, and also corporations seeking to avoid those laws. This conflict of interest came to a head in 2015, when PwC leaked secret Australian Government tax plans to corporations, including Google, and used their privileged access to help corporations avoid a law they themselves helped write. The scandal has major implications for governments and consulting businesses in Australia, particularly PwC itself.

Following the scandal's public disclosure in 2022, PwC attempted to depict the scandal as a single individual acting alone, but later revelations indicated that the corruption was widespread, and included PwC Australia's CEO. Further revelations came to light that have implicated other organisations in the Australian public service and consulting industry, and which became the focus of a broader discussion about government outsourcing.

A Senate Committee concluded that PwC had engaged in a deliberate strategy over many years to cover up the breach of confidentiality.

== Context ==
The scandal occurred in the context of increasing privatisation in Australia, which began to accelerate in the 1990s. In 2015, the size of the public service was capped to 167,596 employees, which saw the public sector become increasingly reliant on outsourced labour, particularly from consulting firms.

From 2013 to 2023, state and federal government contracts for the Big Four accounting firms increased by 400%, and 1,270% by the federal government alone. By 2023, total federal and state spending on consultants totaled $20.8 billion per year, with $5 billion spent by the federal government alone. The federal government was PwC Australia's biggest client, with over $500 million in yearly contracts by 2023.

The general trend has been described as privatisation by stealth, especially for firms with a clear vested interest, like Deloitte, EY, KPMG, PwC influencing tax law.

=== Leadership ===
Luke Sayers served as CEO of PwC Australia between April 2012 and May 2020, the breaches by Peter Collins took place during this period of time. Tom Seymour succeed Sayers in May 2020 until his departure as a result of the PwC Tax Scandal.

=== Treasury development of OECD tax law ===
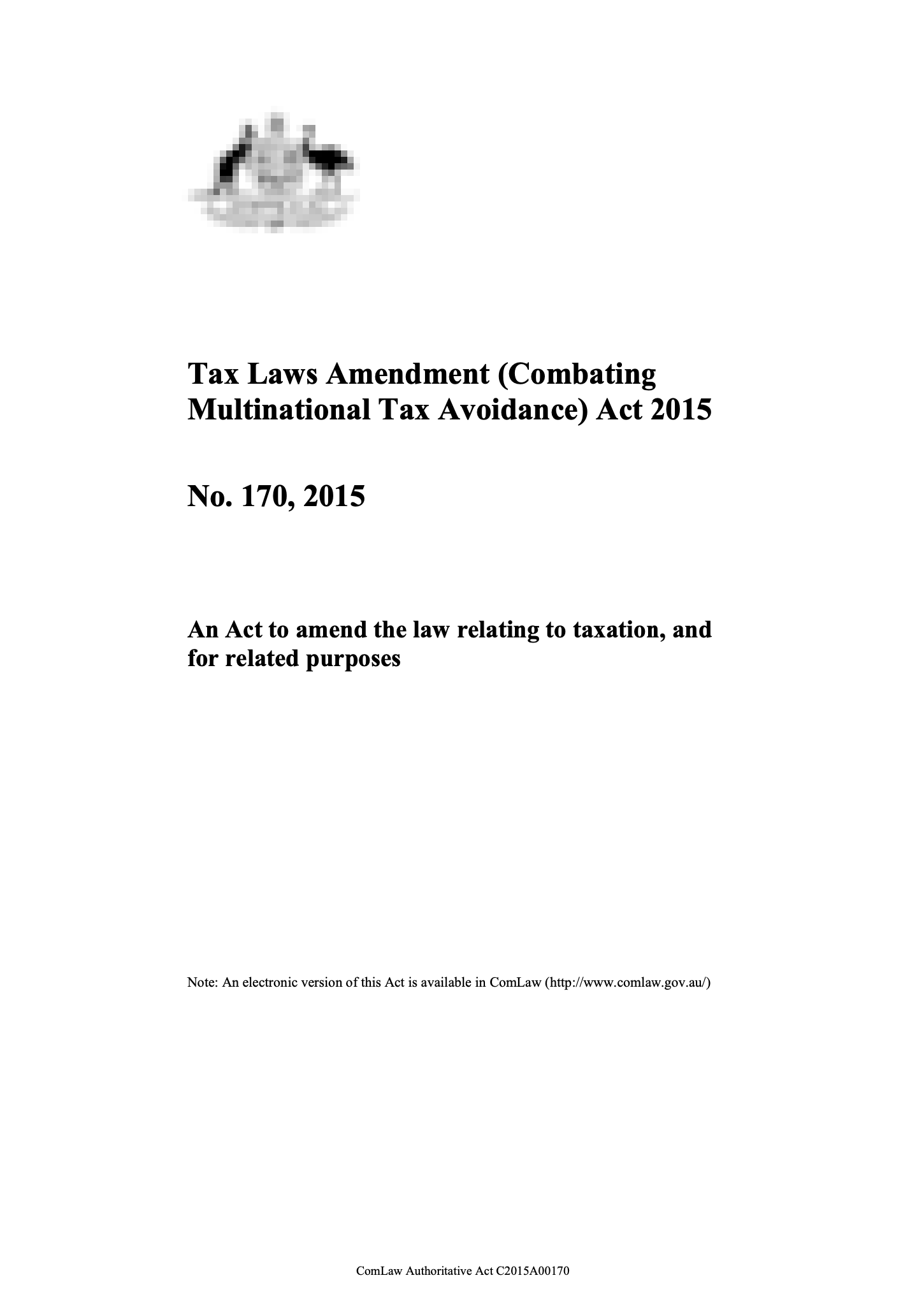
The front cover of the legislation which contains the MAAL - the Tax Laws Amendment (Combating Multinational Tax Avoidance) Act 2015

In 2012, the OECD and G20 started a project on tax base erosion and profit shifting, to try to reduce tax avoidance by closing loopholes in tax laws for multinational corporations. The Australian Treasury was tasked with carrying out the Australian implementation of the project.

In 2013, the Treasury engaged PwC partner Peter Collins to provide advice on the development of the new laws. Collins, a Melbourne resident, was the head of PwC Australia's international tax group.

This work culminated in the Multi-national Anti-Avoidance Law (MAAL), which was passed in 2015, coming into effect at the start of 2016.

== Breach of confidentiality ==
From when Peter Collins began his work at Treasury in 2013, he signed three separate confidentiality agreements to protect the secrecy of the work.

However, Collins violated these agreements, sharing confidential Treasury information with at least 53 partners at the firm, including in the tax advisory arm. This confidential information allowed PwC tax advisors to develop strategies to counter the new tax avoidance law, before the law was published in 2015.

PwC claimed that confidential information was not shared with clients, except one, later revealed to be Google. However, PwC used the confidential information to advise at least 14 companies in how to avoid the law, earning at least $2.5 million for the firm. Among the companies which attempted to apply PwC's advice to avoid the new tax laws were Uber and Facebook.

== ATO response ==
When the tax avoidance law came into effect in 2016, the Australian Taxation Office (ATO) noticed companies reacting to the new law unexpectedly quickly, restructuring their operations to avoid the new scheme. The ATO issued notices to 3 companies to amend their structures, which prevented the new scheme from being implemented. It was estimated this prevented $180 million from being lost annually.

The ATO wanted to investigate the situation to determine how the scheme could have been developed so quickly, especially given that some of the corporations were clients of PwC. The ATO inquired about its suspicions with PwC on multiple occasions, sending at least 46 formal notices to provide information, and raising their concerns directly with then chief executive Luke Sayers. Sayers later said he did not recall the requests.

However, PwC refused to send the ATO documents by using over fifteen thousand claims of legal professional privilege, claims which the Federal Court of Australia later determined were invalid. The ATO later told PwC in 2022 that it would apply a penalty against the firm for any false privilege claims, however, the penalties were settled confidentially in 2023. The penalties had initially been for $1.4 million, but the ATO halved that fine and blocked any further action, which was attributed to the ATO having mixed up some of the documents.

The ATO made continued attempts to learn more about the situation, without success. In 2018, secrecy laws prevented the ATO from sharing their information with the Treasury, meaning the two organisations could not combine their knowledge. The ATO also reported their suspicions to the Australian Federal Police (AFP), but the AFP refused to investigate without detailed information, which the ATO did not have the powers to gather.

=== Change of CEO ===
On 5 March 2020, Tom Seymour was elected as CEO of PwC Australia, replacing Luke Sayers. This was despite internal warnings to PwC's board of directors that Seymour was a risky pick, given his history in the company's tax practice.

== Tax Practitioners Board investigation ==
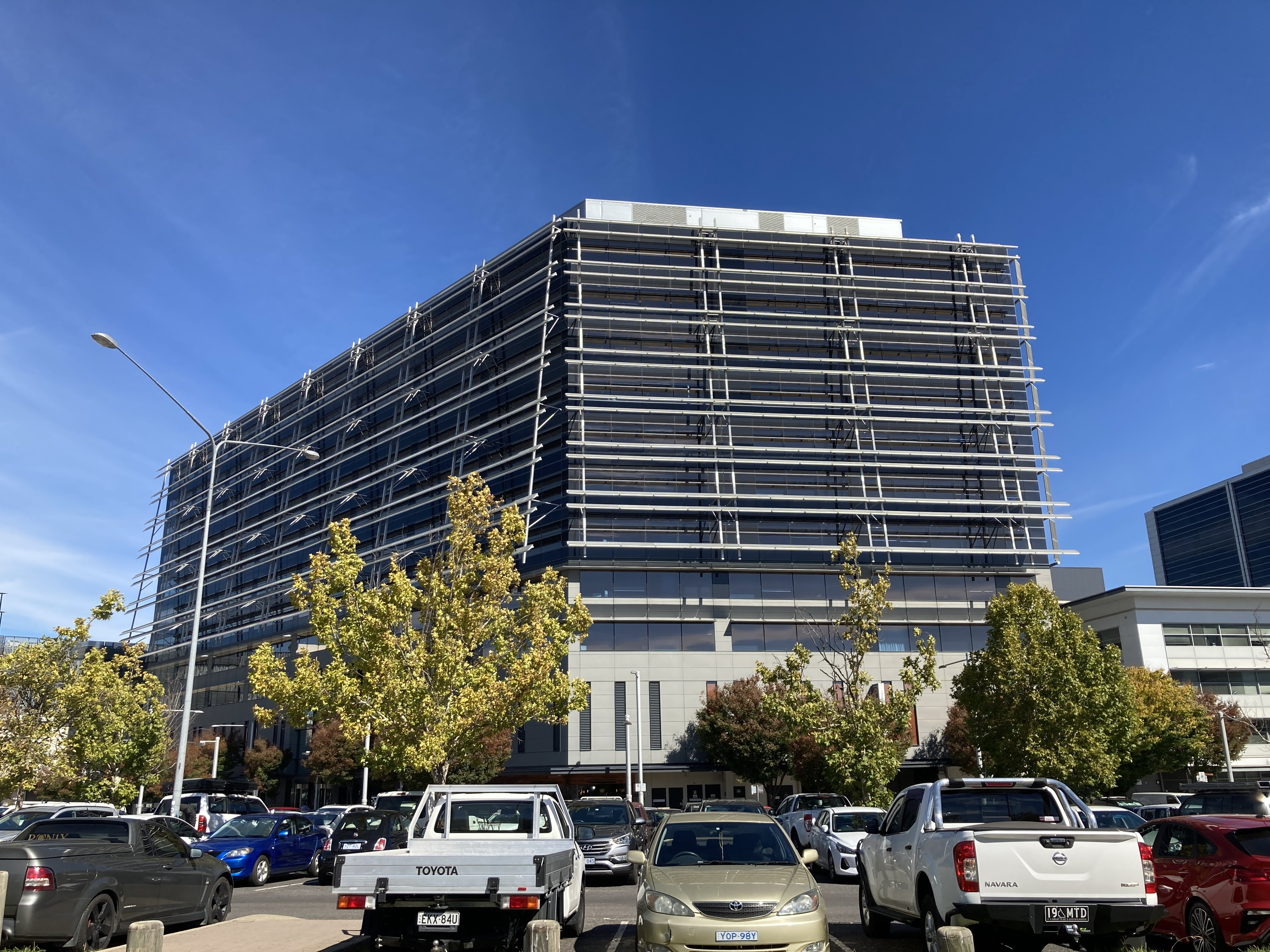
Offices of the Australian Taxation Office, Canberra

Since the AFP investigation could not proceed, the ATO referred their suspicions to the Tax Practitioners Board, a government body responsible for regulating the tax advisory industry. The Tax Practitioners Board (TPB) regulates tax practitioners to protect and assure consumers that tax practitioners meet appropriate standards of professional and ethical conduct.

The matter was referred on 2 July 2020, and the TPB commenced an investigation in early 2021.

Michael O'Neill led the investigation into the PwC scandal, as CEO of the TPB. Michael O’Neill and Peter Collins were both members of the same tax advisory group run out of Treasury to advise the federal government on international tax avoidance strategies, and which was the subject of the TPB review. At the time of the scandal in 2015, O’Neill had been an assistant commissioner at the ATO.

Michael O'Neill was moved in November 2025 to another regulator in a more junior role in a shift that was expected to disrupt multiple inquiries into PwC. Michael O'Neill was found on 9 December 2025 to have given incorrect evidence to the NSW Supreme Court in December 2024 which was "highly unsatisfactory and damaging to Mr O’Neill's reliability and credibility as a witness" but the Court found in unnecessary to decide if Mr O'Neill knowingly gave untrue evidence.

== Public revelation ==
In December 2022, the Tax Practitioners Board announced that it had suspended Collins' tax licence for two years, due to unspecified breaches of integrity standards. The TPB also required PwC to provide training on managing conflicts of interest, and provide compliance reports to the TPB, for 2 years.

After an article was published in the Australian Financial Review, the TPB issued a press release explaining its findings. The article prompted a response from treasurer Jim Chalmers decrying the alleged conduct as "an appalling breach of trust."

The two Australian Financial Review journalists who broke the story — Neil Chenoweth and Edmund Tadros — were named Journalists of the Year at the Kennedy Awards. Collins would later be banned from providing financial services for eight years by the Australian Securities & Investments Commission (ASIC).

The CEO of PwC Australia, Tom Seymour, stated that he was deeply disappointed and the firm had taken action to protect against this happening again. Later comments from Seymour indicated that the incident 10 years ago was an isolated one, and the partner responsible was no longer with the firm. However, it was later reported that around 20-30 PwC partners and staff may have been involved.

=== Senate inquiry ===
In March, a Senate Committee Inquiry commenced, focusing on the management of government consultants in general. In May, 144 emails uncovered by the inquiry were published by Australian Labor Party Senator Deborah O'Neill.

Contrary to CEO Tom Seymour's previous statements, the emails revealed that the scheme was known to at least 53 PwC partners. At least 14 global companies were advised on the new tax framework, and 3 of those companies attempted to restructure in order to avoid their tax obligations.

They also revealed that Tom Seymour himself had been included in emails relating to the scheme. Seymour stepped down as CEO, but remained employed at the firm. Kristin Stubbins took over as acting CEO.

=== AFP investigation ===
On 24 May 2023, the Secretary to the Treasury, Steven Kennedy, referred the PwC matter to the Australian Federal Police (AFP) for a possible criminal investigation. The AFP began its investigation, focusing on Peter Collins in particular.

However, the AFP's impartiality was questioned after a Senate hearing the following day, where it was revealed that the AFP had nine active contracts with PwC for internal auditing. Furthermore, a former NSW police commissioner Mick Fuller was now a PwC partner - and was friends with AFP commissioner Reece Kershaw. David Shoebridge, in the Senate on 21 June 2023 targeted PwC over documents that show how it won a contract with the AFP. Both Fuller and Kershaw met on the 28 July 2022 about the crafting of a contract for PwC to review the Australian Federal Police operations in the ACT. Senator Shoebridge raised serious concerns over the issue of a perceived, or apparent, conflict of interest on the part of the AFP's commissioner.

SMS messages obtained by Shoebridge revealed about a dozen friendly messages between Fuller and Kershaw in 2023. Kershaw responded that the relationship was strictly professional and thus did not need to be disclosed. It was also revealed that the chief operating officer of the AFP, Charlotte Tressler, had worked for PwC for 13 years, and had been a decision-maker for a $794,000 contract for PwC to review its ACT policing arm. At this point the AFP paused all PwC contracts, while the review was taking place.

In October 2024, the AFP raided PwC's head office in Sydney after a joint parliamentary committee found its international arm was withholding critical information about the scandal.

== PwC response ==
When the story went public in January 2023, PwC stated that a single partner was responsible for the breach, and reiterated that it has "procedures and policies...to prevent this occurring".

When it was later revealed that the corruption was widespread, PwC published an apology in May 2023, admitting to a clear lack of respect for confidentiality, inadequate processes and governance in place, a culture of inappropriate behaviour and lack of accountability.

On 3 July 2023, PwC Australia announced that it had investigated itself. It admitted to multiple abuses of confidential information and other malfeasance identified by the ATO, and determined that the failure lay with the firm's leadership and governance. Eight partners had or would be fired, including PwC Australia's CEO.

=== Scyne Advisory spinoff ===
In June, PwC sold off its government consulting business, leaving PwC Australia as a tax advisory firm only. The consulting arm was sold for the price of $1 to private equity firm Allegro Funds. The business was renamed Scyne Advisory. Scyne began with 117 former PwC partners, but would make over 1,500 offers of employment to other PwC staff. Scyne's remuneration model consists of base salary and bonuses, as well as equity in the firm, rather than a direct share of yearly profits.

The senate inquiry revealed that PwC had been intending to split the two sides of the business since 2019. Despite this, in response to a 2019 inquiry on conflicts of interest in consulting, PwC had made a submission stating that they were managing potential conflicts, and that "separating the firm would negatively impact audit quality outcomes if it were to limit access to multidisciplinary capabilities".

=== Ziggy Switkowski report ===
In May 2023, PwC announced another review of its Australian operations, headed by former NBN boss Ziggy Switkowski, however, further details clarified that the review would not examine past conduct, strictly limited to recommendations going forward.

The report revealed a “shadow culture” that operated behind PwC's stated culture and mission. PwC had ignored law-breaking by “rainmaker” partners in the pursuit of profit, the CEO had “excessive power”, and loyalty to powerful bosses was rewarded over questioning the status-quo.

A “high-performance, results-focused culture has been used as an excuse to justify poor behaviour”, and “Some rainmakers were described as the ‘untouchables’ or individuals to whom ‘the rules don’t always apply’.” An “aggressive growth agenda overshadowed and occurred at the expense of the firm's values and purpose” and contributed to a culture of "growth at all costs"

The report highlighted PwC's deceptive public image: “PwC Australia's glossy PowerPoint presentations sometimes give a false impression of comprehensive and disciplined structures and processes when the reality is much less tidy”

=== Two law firm reviews ===
The firm paid two law firms to investigate the tax leaks, but made no commitment to release the results publicly.

On 27 September 2023, PwC announced the results of the investigation by Linklaters. It stated that six isolated individuals should have questioned whether information was confidential, and maintained the innocence of PwC's clients and all PwC employees outside of Australia. Labor Senator Deborah O’Neill countered that “PwC Global were aware of this misconduct for a significant period of time.”

O'Neill called the review a corporate cover-up, while Greens senator Barbara Pocock called for PwC to be banned from future contracts, and said she would refer the company to the National Anti-Corruption Commission when it commences operation.

=== Employee departures ===
In July 2023, eight partners left including the former CEO Tom Seymour. The same month PwC agreed to pay back the almost $1 million it received for a 2017 report on the Robodebt scheme that it never delivered, instead delivering an 8-slide PowerPoint presentation. The Robodebt scheme represented another major public service scandal of the time.

In November 2023, 338 staff were made redundant. In March 2024, PwC announced a further 366 roles would be made redundant.

== Further investigations ==
By mid-2023 there were 10 ongoing investigations into PwC. Four parliamentary inquiries were underway, including:

- New South Wales Legislative Council - NSW Government's use and management of consulting services
- Parliamentary Joint Committee on Corporations and Financial Services - Ethics and Professional Accountability: Structural Challenges in the Audit, Assurance and Consultancy Industry
- Senate Economics Legislation Committee - Treasury Laws Amendment (Making Multinationals Pay Their Fair Share-Integrity and Transparency)

Calls came from transparency advocates, and some politicians, for a ban on political donations from consulting firms, with the Big Four having donated $4.3 million to major political parties over the past decade.

PwC Australia had traditionally sponsored an annual dinner for the government on the night of the national budget. The yearly dinner, which cost $5000 per head, had been held in the Great Hall of Parliament House until 2022. However, in May 2023, PwC pulled out of the event.

=== Prior conflicts ===
In late July 2023, it was revealed that the ATO had privately settled a separate matter with PwC which had not been publicly disclosed. The settlement came in March, at a time when the scale of the tax scandal had been publicly stated to be restricted to a single former employee. Additionally, the ATO had known about a potential issue since 2016 but had not acted due to a lack of information.

It was also revealed that PwC had a similar conflict of interest when producing a 2017 review of the government's digital mental health strategy, while PwC owned a 45% share of one of the companies under review.

The Murray-Darling Basin Authority had awarded PwC a $27 million river modelling contract, as well as a contract for auditing the Authority. In June, the Authority sought assurance that PwC had not breached its confidentiality agreements, referring the contracts to its audit committee.

Mike Pezzullo, the secretary of the Department of Home Affairs, stated the scandal demonstrated the need for a National Anti-Corruption Commission, a government body that had recently been introduced. Pezzullo himself would be stood down in September, over evidence that he had had discussions with Liberal Party powerbrokers and had advocated for and against MPs.

== Outcomes for PwC ==
As of 2023, the only legal consequences for PwC have been the TPB's requirement to provide training to relevant staff and provide compliance reports to the TPB.

In January 2023, Chartered Accountants Australia and New Zealand began an investigation as a result of the TPB's finding. In November, the investigation fined PwC its maximum fine of $50,000, with PwC covering the costs of the nearly year-long investigation. The organisation had recently increased its maximum Disciplinary Tribunal fine to $250,000 for future cases.

In November 2023 Australian bank Westpac announced it would cease its relationship with PwC, which had been Westpac's external auditor since 2002.

== Other consulting firms ==
The senate inquiry into consulting firms uncovered instances of similar conduct at other consulting firms:

- Deloitte admitted that it had failed to disclose a similar conflict of interest when it advised the Australian National Audit Office (ANAO) on an IT procurement process, while simultaneously advising one of the bidding companies in the process. This violated ANAO policy.
- Deloitte had also failed to disclose a similar conflict of interest in its $1.5 million engagement with the Department of Home Affairs. Deloitte had advised the department on a tender process, while simultaneously advising one of the bidders on how to obtain the contract. The department had become aware of this conflict, and terminated Deloitte's contract. However, nobody was disciplined over the incident. The senate inquiry did not question Deloitte on its response to the breach.
- An ex-partner at Deloitte had shared confidential military documents with Synergy 360, a consultancy which was trying to win military consulting contracts. At the time, Synergy 360 was the subject of yet another controversy, where associates were alleged to have offered MP Stuart Robert financial incentives to award them contracts at Services Australia.

The senate inquiry also saw Deloitte Australia's CEO sensationally admit that he did not deserve his multi-million dollar salary.

KPMG was later accused of systematically overcharging the Department of Defence, its biggest client, by billing the department for work that had not been done. Over the last five years the firm had hired almost 100 staff who had previously worked for the department.

== Regulatory reforms ==
There was speculation that other Big Four companies could follow PwC's lead and separate their consulting and auditing arms, in order to resolve the conflict of interests between the two. Rival firm KPMG proposed a review of professional services. It suggested the government could consult on a charter for public service consulting, and that ASIC could have an extended regulatory role in the sector.

In August 2023, the federal government announced a crackdown on tax advisor misconduct in response to the scandal. Fines for tax advisors who tried to skirt tax laws increased from $7.8 million to $780 million.

In December 2024, the government passed world-leading tax transparency laws, which require multinational corporations to disclose their revenue in each region. The laws were delayed by more than 12 months, and PwC had been among the companies urging the government to reconsider.

In December 2024, the Albanese government Treasury began reviewing the prevalence of false claims of legal professional privilege, which PwC had used to evade government scrutiny.
