= Nicholas Waterhouse =

British accountant (1877-1964)

Sir Nicholas Edwin Waterhouse, KBE (24 August 1877 – 29 December 1964) was a British accountant who was senior partner of the firm Price Waterhouse & Company, and president of the Institute of Chartered Accountants. He was also a noted philatelist who was added to the Roll of Distinguished Philatelists in 1940.

== Early life ==
Waterhouse was the son of Edwin Waterhouse, one of the founding members of the Institute of Chartered Accountants in 1880. Nicholas was educated at Winchester and then New College, University of Oxford.

== Career ==
Waterhouse entered his father's firm in 1899. By 1945 he was senior partner. Unable to serve in the military in the First World War due to an injured knee, he worked at the War Office and performed similar official functions during the Second World War. He was made K.B.E. in 1920 for his service in the earlier war. He was auditor to Royal Exchange Assurance, the Oriental Steam Navigation Company, the Duchy of Cornwall and Westminster Abbey.

== Philately ==
Waterhouse was a specialist in the stamps of the United States of which he formed and sold two award-winning collections.

== Family ==
In 1903 he married Audrey Lewin who died in 1945. He married Louise How in 1953 who survived him. There were no children from either marriage.

== Selected publications ==
- A comprehensive catalogue of the postage stamps of the United States of America. London, Frank Godden, 1916.
- A list of the stamps of the United States of America issued for general postage from 1847 to 1908. London, Frank Godden, 1921.
