= Samuel Price (disambiguation) =

Samuel Price (1805–1884) was an American politician.

Samuel Price may also refer to:

- Samuel Lowell Price (1821–1887), English accountant
- Samuel Grove Price (1793–1839), British politician
- Samuel Woodson Price (1828–1918), American general
- Sammy Price (1908–1992), American musician
- Sammy Price (American football) (1943–2026), American football player
