= Esso Australia Resources Ltd v Federal Commissioner of Taxation =

Judgement of the High Court of Australia

Esso v Commissioner of Taxation
- Court: High Court of Australia
- Full case name: Esso Australia Resources Ltd v Federal Commissioner of Taxation
- Decided: 21 December 1999
- Citations: [1999] HCA 67; 201 CLR 49

Court membership
- Judges sitting: Gleeson CJ, Gaudron, McHugh, Gummow, Kirby, Callinan JJ

Case opinions
- The common law test for legal professional privilege is the 'dominant purpose' test (per Gleeson CJ, Gaudron and Gummow JJ) (concurring - Callinan J) dissent McHugh J Kirby J

Esso Australia Resources Ltd v Federal Commissioner of Taxation, also known as 'Esso', is a decision of the High Court of Australia.

At issue was a claim of legal professional privilege by the oil and gas conglomerate Esso, in respect of over 500 documents. The documents were subject of a discovery order by the Commissioner of Taxation during a proceeding by the company against a set of amended income tax assessments.

The case is notable as an authority for the test of legal professional privilege in Australian common law. It established the 'dominant purpose' test as the applicable test, overruling the 'sole purpose' test from Grant v Downs. This unified Australia's common law test with those established by prominent Evidence law statutes; particularly the Evidence Acts belonging to the Commonwealth and NSW. It also aligned Australia's test with that of other common law jurisdictions such as that of New Zealand and the United Kingdom.

Prior to Esso, differing tests at common law and statute caused complications for Australian judges and legal practitioners. For example, differing tests applied between privilege in the adduction of evidence, and privilege in pre-trial proceedings.

== Facts ==
In 1996 Esso commenced proceedings in the Federal Court, appealing against amended income tax assessments. Orders for discovery were made, and privilege was claimed in respect of 577 documents. After discussion between the parties, it was agreed that some of the documents qualified for protection under the sole purpose test; whereas others would only be protected by the dominant purpose test.

At first instance, Foster J held that the correct test that applied to the discovered documents was the 'sole purpose' test in Grant v Downs; rather than the 'dominant purpose' test as set out in ss118 and 119 of the Evidence Act 1999 (Cth).

Foster J's finding was upheld by the Full Federal Court by Black CJ, Sundberg and Finkelstein JJ. Beaumont and Merkel JJ dissented.

Esso then appealed to the High Court. One of their arguments was that the court should declare that at common law, the dominant purpose test applies to legal professional privilege.

== Judgement ==
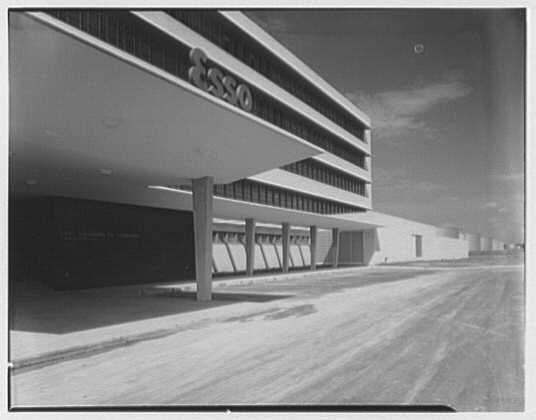
Pictured: the 'Esso building' in Baton Rouge, Louisiana. Photo taken in 1950.

Pictured: Esso's corporate logo. Esso is a trading name/brand for its parent company, ExxonMobil. The company began as Standard Oil of New Jersey following the breakup of Standard Oil.

=== Majority ===
==== Gleeson CJ, Gaudron and Gummow JJ ====
The plurality judgement discussed at length the history of common law development sometimes having origins 'in statute, or as glosses on statute, or as responses to statute'. Nevertheless, they declined to develop the common law test in this way. Instead, they decided to accept the appellant's invitation to reconsider Grant v Downs.

The plurality rationalized the majority judgement in Grant v Downs as compatible with the dominant purpose test. Barwick CJ's view in that case, previously referred to as a dissent, was recharacterised by the court in Esso as a concurrence. The court noted a passage from Barwick in that case which had 'proven influential in other jurisdictions'.

Barwick had written:

'The Court should state the relevant principle as follows: a document which was produced or brought into existence either with the dominant purpose of its author, or of the person or authority under whose direction, whether particular or general, it was produced or brought into existence, of using it or its contents in order to obtain legal advice or to conduct or aid in the conduct of litigation, at the time of its production in reasonable prospect, should be privileged and excluded from inspection.'

They acknowledged that the Grant sole purpose test had been followed in Australia for 20 years. They then decided to evaluate whether to reconsider the reasoning of the majority. This evaluation was undertaken with reference to Commonwealth v Hospital Contribution Fund, a case concerning principles relating applying to the High Court's reconsideration of its own opinions.

The court then characterised the sole purpose test enunciated by Stephen, Mason and Murphy JJ in Grant as unprincipled. The plurality then claimed that their reasons did not require a preference for the sole purpose test over the dominant purpose test.

It described the primary issue facing the court with regard to the two tests as follows:

'The search is for a test which strikes an appropriate balance between two competing considerations: the public policy reflected in the privilege itself, and the public policy that, in the administration of justice and investigative procedures, there should be unfettered access to relevant information. Additionally, whatever test is adopted must be capable of being applied in practice with reasonable certainty and without undue delay and expense in resolving disputed claims.'

The New Zealand Court of Appeal was quoted for calling the sole purpose test 'extraordinarily narrow'. 'If to be taken literally' the plurality in Esso said; legal professional privilege would be displaced if there existed merely 'one other purpose in addition to the legal purpose, regardless of how relatively unimportant it may be, and even though, without the legal purpose, the document would never have come into existence'. The court asserted that some judges had applied the Grant v Downs test in non-literal ways, suggesting that the test was unworkable; and that judges were implicitly applying the dominant purpose anyway. The court even suggested that arguments from the Taxation Commissioner in an effort to define what they meant by the sole purpose test, actually resembled (and therefore supported) adoption of the dominant purpose test.

Of the legal tests for privilege prior to Grant v Downs, the plurality said they were 'unduly protective of written communications within corporations and bureaucracies'. The sole purpose test was said to 'go to the other extreme'. Corporations and bureaucracies 'necessarily conduct a large proportion of their internal communications in writing. If the circumstance that a document primarily directed to lawyers is incidentally directed to someone else as well means that privilege does not attach, the result seems to alter the balance too far the other way'.

The High Court then said 'the dominant purpose test should be preferred'; presumably endorsing the test as it was formulated by Barwick CJ in Grant. This test was said to 'strike a just balance, it suffices to rule out claims of the kind considered in Grant v Downs and Waugh, and bring the common law of Australia into conformity with other common law jurisdictions'.

==== Callinan J ====
Concurring with the plurality, Callinan J discussed the sole purpose test at length, alongside critical commentary of the Grant decision. He regarded the Grant v Downs test as an inconvenient test, and not 'wholly fair' in accordance with the 'underlying rationale for legal professional privilege, of candour by clients in communications with legal advisers'. Neither did the test emerge, in his view, from 'full and considered argument by the parties' in Grant v Downs. Additionally, Callinan J was concerned that the test 'may have a tendency to discriminate against corporations and other large organisations'.

For those reasons he decided that Grant v Downs ought be overruled. He endorsed comments by the House of Lords which themselves endorsed the 'dominant purpose' test as expressed by Barwick in Grant v Downs. He added that 'whether a purpose is a dominant purpose, is, in my view, a matter to be objectively determined but the subjective purpose will always be relevant and often decisive'.

=== Dissenting ===
==== McHugh J ====
In his honours opinion, the ratio of Grant v Downs ought not have been overruled. McHugh gave two reasons for this. His first reason was that the dominant purpose test would 'extend the area of privilege with the result that a party to litigation, and the court, would have less access to relevant material'. His second reason was that it would impose a test that is 'not easy of application and which seems inconsistent with the rationale of legal professional privilege'.

He added that the dominant purpose test was one that would 'lead to extensive interlocutory litigation because ... the person claiming privilege can be cross-examined on the affidavit claiming privilege'.

==== Kirby J ====
Kirby referred to comments he had made in an earlier case in which he had suggested that:

'a brake on the application of legal professional privilege is needed to prevent its operation bringing the law into "disrepute", principally because it frustrates access to communications which would otherwise help courts to determine, with accuracy and efficiency, where the truth lies in disputed matters'.

He stated that he 'remained of that view' and that Esso's appeal to change the common law ought be rejected.

== Significance ==
Esso is a decision of high importance to the Australian legal system. According to LawCite, it is the 112th most cited High Court decision in Australia.

Professor Chester Brown of the University of Sydney, commented in 2000 of the decision, writing:

"The decision in Esso significantly broadens the scope of legal professional privilege, and its practical effect is to alleviate the problem of protecting privileged information in large corporations and public authorities.

While the decision is sound from a practical point of view, the dissenting judges raise legitimate concerns over the extension of the privilege. These concerns include a possible increase in the amount of pre-trial applications challenging privilege claims, and an enhancement of the ability of large litigants to claim privilege over non-legal communications and, accordingly, frustrate the ability of judicial decision-makers to have access to relevant information."

In addition to the case's relevance to legal professional privilege; Esso has been cited by the High Court as supporting the proposition that legislation has a legitimate influence on the development of Australian common law. It has also been cited by the Commonwealth Government in Plaintiff M47/2012, in which it was used to support an argument that 'the power to disturb settled authority is to be exercised with restraint'. The precedent at dispute in Plaintiff M47 was Al-Kateb.

== See also ==
- Legal professional privilege in Australia
- Legal professional privilege in England and Wales
- List of High Court of Australia cases
