= Edwin Waterhouse =

English accountant (1841-1917)

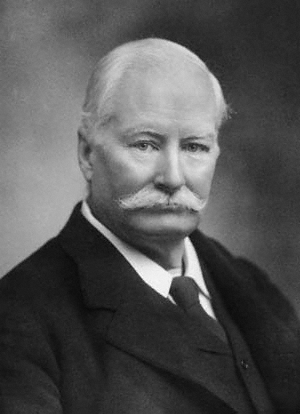
Waterhouse, c. 1907

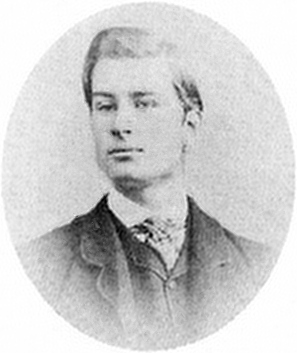
Edwin Waterhouse young

Edwin Waterhouse (4 June 1841 – 17 September 1917) was an English accountant. He is best known for having co-founded, with Samuel Lowell Price and William Hopkins Holyland, the accountancy practice of Price Waterhouse that now forms a part of PricewaterhouseCoopers.

== Career ==
Born at Oakfield, Aigburth, Liverpool, Edwin Waterhouse was the son of a wealthy cotton broker. His brothers were prominent architect Alfred Waterhouse, designer of London's Natural History Museum and many other iconic Victorian buildings, and solicitor Theodore Waterhouse, who founded the firm of Waterhouse & Co. that continues to practise in the City of London (now as part of Field Fisher Waterhouse).

Edwin Waterhouse was educated at University College School and then its associated university University College London. He joined forces with Samuel Lowell Price and William Hopkins Holyland at new offices at No. 13 Gresham Street in London in 1865. In 1889 Waterhouse, along with a group of prominent businessmen, politicians and lawyers, founded The Law Debenture Corporation. He also served as president of the Institute of Chartered Accountants for the years 1892 to 1894.

Waterhouse's memoirs, describing his upbringing, education and professional life, along with his relationship with his two brothers, were found in the firm's archive in 1985, and an edited version produced in 1988.

In 2007 the courtyard of Foxhill House, the Alfred Waterhouse designed building that now houses the University of Reading's faculty of law, was refurbished with a grant from PriceWaterhouseCoopers in memory of Edwin Waterhouse.

His son, Nicholas Edwin Waterhouse, became senior partner of Price Waterhouse & Company, and president of the Institute of Chartered Accountants.

== References and sources ==
Sources

- W. H. Auden – Family Ghosts
