= Theodore Waterhouse =

English solicitor

Theodore Waterhouse (1838–1891) was an English solicitor and founder of the City of London law firm Waterhouse & Co, which now forms part of Fieldfisher.

Theodore Waterhouse was born in 1838 in Aigburth, Liverpool, the son of a wealthy cotton broker Quaker parents. He was one of a famous triumvirate of brothers. Alfred Waterhouse was a prominent architect and designer of London's Natural History Museum and many other iconic Victorian buildings. Edwin Waterhouse was an equally prominent accountant, who co-founded the accountancy practice of Price Waterhouse that now forms part of PricewaterhouseCoopers.
