= Robert Hiester Montgomery =

American writer (1872–1953)

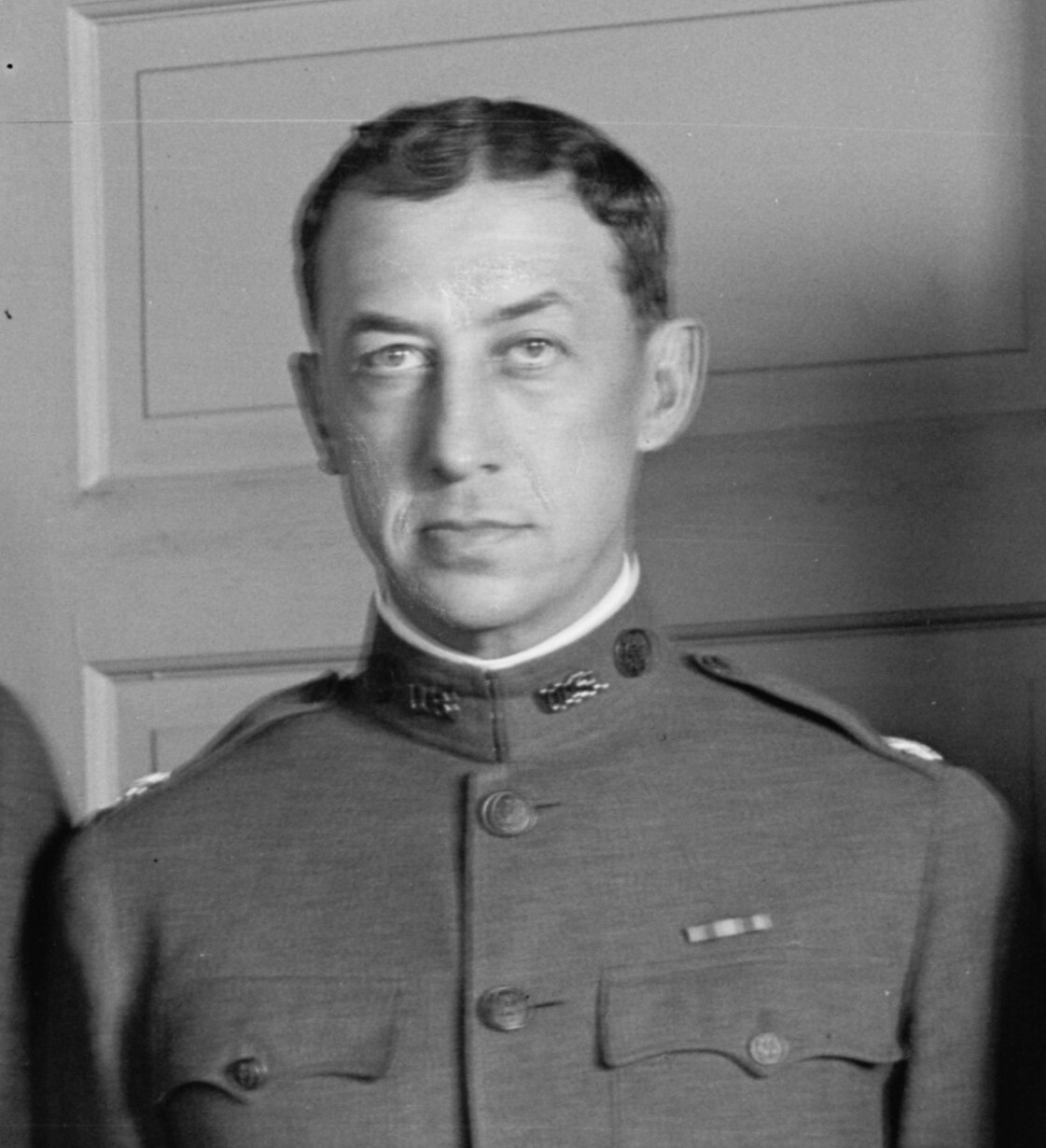
- Montgomery, c. 1917–1918
- Born: September 21, 1872; Mahanoy City, Pennsylvania, U.S.
- Died: May 2, 1953 (aged 80); Coral Gables, Florida, U.S.
- Spouses: Elizabeth Adams Shaw; Lois Cate Gibb; Eleanor Foster
- Scientific career
- Fields: Accounting; Law; Education

Robert Hiester Montgomery (September 21, 1872 – May 2, 1953) was an American accountant, educator, and author. He co-founded Lybrand, Ross Brothers & Montgomery, a predecessor of PricewaterhouseCoopers (PwC).

Montgomery was twice president of the American Institute of Accountants (AICPA), contributed to the founding of the Journal of Accountancy, and authored Auditing Theory and Practice (1912), the first major American auditing textbook. In 1950, he was inducted into the Accounting Hall of Fame.

== Life and work ==
Montgomery quit school at 14 and went to work to help out his family. In 1889, he got a job as an office boy at the Philadelphia accounting firm of John Heins (later Heins, Whelen & Lybrand). There he learned accounting and was made a partner after seven years.

Two years later, in 1898, Montgomery and three of his colleagues, William M. Lybrand, Adam A. Ross Jr., and his brother T. Edward Ross, formed Lybrand, Ross Brothers & Montgomery. Two years later, the firm opened an office in New York City under Montgomery's management. In his spare time, Montgomery learned law. He was admitted to the New York Bar in 1904. Montgomery established his law firm, Robert H. Montgomery, Attorney at Law, and worked on many difficult tax cases for clients. In 1905, Montgomery led a reorganization of the American Institute of Certified Public Accountants (AICPA). He created the Journal of Accountancy (then called the American Journal of Accounting). The first issue contained his Professional Standards. He was president of the AICPA for two terms, first in 1912 and again in 1935.

Montgomery also got into the field of education by developing a curriculum in accounting for Columbia University. He was hired as Columbia's first accounting professor in 1910 and stayed there until 1939.

Montgomery saw the need for a book on auditing. In 1912, he wrote Auditing: Theory and Practice. This was the first American book on auditing. Two other authors joined him for the seventh edition, and the book was retitled Montgomery's Auditing. After Montgomery's death, the eighth edition was published in 1957 by two other authors. It is still in print and is now in its 12th edition.

Commissioned as a Lieutenant Colonel (1918) during World War I, he was generally referred to thereafter as Colonel Montgomery. He received the AICPA's Gold Medal Award in 1949. In 1950, he was inducted into the Accounting Hall of Fame in the first year of that award.

Montgomery was a highly respected leader of the profession of accountancy for over 60 years. His influence is still felt in auditing theory and practice, federal income taxation, professional accounting organizations, and accounting education.

=== Personal life ===
Montgomery lived in Greenwich, Connecticut, and commuted to work in New York City. He established a winter home in north Florida in 1927. He sold it and moved to the suburbs of Miami, Florida, in 1930 to be in a more tropical area. Here, he decided to collect palm trees. He built an estate called the Coconut Grove Palmetum on Old Cutler Drive about seven miles south of Coconut Grove. His love of tropical plants led him to establish a public garden. With the help of others, he led the effort to establish Fairchild Tropical Garden in 1937, which opened to the public on March 23, 1938.

== Legacy ==
In 1957, Cooper Brothers & Co (UK), McDonald, Currie and Co (Canada), and Lybrand, Ross Brothers & Montgomery (US) merged to form Coopers & Lybrand. For the rest of the century, Coopers & Lybrand was known as one of the "Big Eight". On 1 July 1998, the worldwide merger of Price Waterhouse and Coopers & Lybrand created the current PricewaterhouseCoopers. PricewaterhouseCoopers is the world's largest professional services firm measured by revenues and one of the "Big Four" accountancy firms.

Montgomery established a collection of pine trees at his home in Greenwich, CT. In 1953, he donated his estate to the town, which is now a 102-acre park in the center of Greenwich. In commemoration of his donation, a cultivar of the Colorado spruce was named Picea pungens 'Montgomery' in his honor.

Montgomery collected manuscript account books and documents illustrating and documenting the history of accounting and business procedures from the 14th century to the 20th century. He donated his collection to Columbia University in 1926. These books constitute the Montgomery Collection at the Rare Book and Manuscript Library in the Butler Library at Columbia University. The materials from his collection were featured in a 1987 Rare Book and Manuscript exhibit at Columbia entitled "The Origins of a Great Profession."

The Montgomery Botanical Center was established in 1959 by Nell Montgomery Jennings in memory of her husband, Colonel Robert H. Montgomery, and his love of palms and cycads. Located on 120 acres in Coral Gables, Florida, it includes the world's largest and finest private collections of palms and cycads.

== Selected publications ==
- Montgomery, Robert Hiester. Auditing theory and practice. The Ronald Press Company, 1912.
- Montgomery, Robert Hiester. Income Tax Procedure. Ronald Press Company, 1921.
- Montgomery, R.H. Fifty Years of Accountancy. New York: Ronald Press, 1939.
- Bogen, Jules Irwin, and Robert Hiester Montgomery. Financial handbook. (1956).
- Defliese, P. L., Johnson, K. P., Montgomery, R. H., & Macleod, R. K. (1975). Auditing. Wiley.
