= Luke Sayers =

Australian businessman

Luke Sayers AM

Luke Sayers AM is an Australian businessman. He is the former CEO of scandal-ridden firm PwC Australia. Sayers was on the board of the Carlton Football Club from 2012 to 2025, and president from August 2021 until January 2025.

== Early life ==
Sayers grew up in country Victoria, the middle son in a family of three children.

Luke was enrolled in Coomoora Secondary College, a government school in Melbourne's south-east. After graduating, he then attended Monash University studying business accounting and information systems.

== Business career ==
Sayers joined PwC's (then called Price Waterhouse) technology audit team as a summer vacation intern in 1991. Sayers worked in many divisions of the organisation, including in Washington D.C. for a number of years. Sayers then was chosen as CEO of PwC Australia for eight years.

Sayers later became the executive chairman of Sayers Group, which is a Melbourne-based investment and advisory company. In 2025, Sayers Group rebranded as Tenet Advisory and Investments, with Sayers himself stepping down as Executive Chairman, however remaining as part of the firm in a lesser capacity.

=== AVP conflict of interest scandal ===
In 2018 Sayers, while CEO of PwC Australia, was connected to conflict of interest issues and an investigation related to a personal investment in Australian Visa Processing (AVP). AVP was a company part-owned by PwC that was submitting a tender to redesign and run Australia's visa processing system, potentially worth billions of dollars, which would result in a significant financial advantage for its investors including Sayers. Other investors included managing partner of firm strategy and ASEANZ Consulting Sammy Kumar, a close friend of Sayers, and government and public sector leader, Tony Peake.

This investment led to a "storm inside the firm", with interjection by PwC Global and a review by PwC Australia of its personal investment policy for partners. The option to invest had not been offered to all partners or even the entire firm and was kept to a limited group of individuals. A review was announced around the way partners make personal investments. This was seen as a factor in ending Kumar’s ambitions to follow Sayers as PwC’s Australia CEO.

=== Frydenberg endorsement controversy ===
In 2022 the Inclusion Foundation, an organisation which Sayers was Chairman of, was linked to a political endorsement for Sayers’ close personal friend Josh Frydenberg. An advertisement for Frydenberg featured a quote from Sayers' wife Cate under the heading 'why I am voting for Josh Frydenberg', which described her as “founder, Inclusion Foundation”. Frydenberg withdrew the ads, because the Australian Charities and Not-for-profits Commission does not allow charities to promote political candidates.

=== PwC tax scandal ===
Sayers has been repeatedly linked to the PwC tax scandal, having been CEO during the period of time that the unauthorised disclosures by Peter Collins took place.

Sayers is the founder and a director of Tenet Advisory & Investments.

== Sports administration career ==
=== Carlton Football Club ===
Sayers joined the board of directors at the Carlton Football Club in 2012. On 28 April 2021 it was announced that the board of the club unanimously elected Sayers as president-elect, at a board meeting to take over the role at the end of the 2021 season. In June 2021 Sayers in his role as president-elect, during the transition period, also initiated a panel that consisted of Carlton Football Club CEO Cain Liddle with external panel members Matthew Pavlich, Geoff Walsh and Graham Lowe to lead an independent external review into the club’s football department operations in the wake of poor on-field results in the 2021 season due to disappointment of expectations.

Sayers officially became the President of Carlton Football Club on 17 August 2021, just one round before the end of the 2021 season, after previous club president Mark LoGiudice stepped down from the role early. The completion of the independent external club review, led by Sayers also led to a clean-out at the club with substantial changes to the club's administration and football department.

On 10 September 2021 Sayers also stated:

“We are entering a reset phase for our football club, and while we have built a strong platform in a business sense, the ability to ensure our on-field position matches, our off-field one is an area that must be addressed,”.

Sayers appointed outgoing Geelong Football Club CEO Brian Cook as the CEO of the Carlton Football Club as one of the substantial personnel changes to the club's administration to replace Cain Liddle, after Liddle was sacked from his position as CEO of Carlton as one of the outcomes of the completion of the independent external review that the club had undertaken, where it was determined by the club, that the gaps between on and off-field performance were too large for Liddle to maintain his position as CEO. Sayers on the appointment of Cook said in a statement:

"Cook’s ability to deliver a sustained level of high performance across every facet of a football club made him the perfect person to take the Blues forward, This is a significant pillar of the Club’s ‘reset’ strategy, whereby our football club is striving to bring in the best available people with strong leadership, who thrive on building and driving a high-performing culture, That is exactly what Carlton needs to take our next, significant step, and nobody fits that criteria better than Brian Cook. While our club is in a strong position off the field, we intend to take this to another level, by being proactive and innovative and Brian, as CEO, will play a pivotal role in leading that approach".

The club review also led to the sacking of David Teague as Carlton Football Club senior coach, with Sayers stating “After careful consideration was taken and the necessary time to absorb the findings of the review... it was made clear that the decision needed to be made to part ways with David Teague”, "it was identified in the review, that there had been confusion associated with the game plan at times and on-field, the team has underdelivered in its ability to consistently defend, win the contest and apply pressure". The club review found that Teague's coaching methods and gameplan were supported by only 30 percent of the club's players and club staff. Michael Voss employed as Carlton Football Club senior coach, was one of the other substantial personnel changes to the club's football department, when Sayers said in a statement "After a thorough and considered selection process, Voss's credentials and vast experience in football made him the right person for the job,".

On 8 January 2025, an image of a lewd nature was briefly posted on his Twitter account before being deleted shortly thereafter. Sayers denied any involvement and claimed his account had been hacked, and his claim was verified following an investigation by the AFL Integrity Unit which cleared him of wrongdoing. Nevertheless, he elected to step down as president after the investigation was complete, departing the club on 22 January. In September 2026, an apology from Sayers was read to the Supreme Court of Victoria by his lawyer after a defamation action was brought by Cate Sayers. The apology backtracked on a claim Sayers had made in a statutory declaration that his former wife had posted a photograph of his penis in a tweet and tagged a female executive at Bupa. Ms Sayers argued her former husband also made false claims in the statement about her mental health and sexual history, and that the AFL investigation was inadequate. The two parties reached a settlement and the judge dismissed the proceedings.

== Order of Australia ==
In 2019 Sayers was made a Member of the Order of Australia for his service to business, to people with a disability, and to the community.
