= William Mitchell Lybrand =

American accountant (1867–1960)

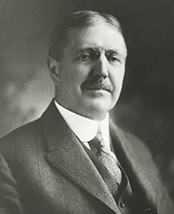
- Lybrand in 1929
- Born: 1867; Philadelphia, Pennsylvania
- Died: 1960 (aged 92–93)
- Occupation: Accountant
- Known for: co-founder of the accounting firm Lybrand, Ross Bros. & Montgomery

William Mitchell Lybrand (1867–1960) was an American accountant and one of the founders of the accounting firm Lybrand, Ross Bros. & Montgomery, which later became part of Coopers & Lybrand and eventually merged with Price Waterhouse in 1998 to form PricewaterhouseCoopers (PwC). He contributed to the early development of professional accounting education in the United States and held leading positions in key professional organizations.

== Early life and career ==
William M. Lybrand was born in 1867 in Philadelphia, Pennsylvania, to a Methodist minister's family.

Lybrand began his accounting career as a clerk at Bement and Daughtery, a machine tool manufacturer in Philadelphia that used one of the first comprehensive cost accounting systems. After advancing to assistant bookkeeper, he learned its structure directly from the system's designer, John W. Francis, whose methods influenced Lybrand's later view that cost data should be closely linked to financial accounting.

He later joined the auditing firm Heins and Whelen, where he became a junior partner.

== Founding of Lybrand, Ross Bros. & Montgomery ==
In 1898, Lybrand, together with brothers Adam A. Ross and T. Edward Ross and his brother-in-law Robert Hiester Montgomery, established the firm Lybrand, Ross Bros. & Montgomery. This date is considered the beginning of the history of the American branch of Coopers & Lybrand.

== Professional contributions ==
He taught evening accounting courses sponsored by the Pennsylvania Institute and personally guaranteed their financial support when the program was incorporated into the Wharton School.

Lybrand helped establish two major professional bodies in accounting — the Pennsylvania Institute of Certified Public Accountants (PICPA) and the National Association of Cost Accountants (NACA), later known as the Institute of Management Accountants (IMA). Beginning in 1902, he served two terms as treasurer and president of PICPA. He later became the second president of NACA, where his professional experience and administrative skills helped strengthen the association’s operations. During his tenure, he supported the development of a series of technical bulletins that evolved into the journal Management Accounting, now published as Strategic Finance.

Lybrand died in 1960.

== Legacy ==
In 1949, his partners at Lybrand, Ross Bros. & Montgomery established the annual Lybrand Medals (gold, silver, and bronze) to honor his contributions to accounting education and to NACA. The tradition continues under the IMA, which awards the Lybrand Awards for outstanding articles in Strategic Finance and Management Accounting Quarterly.

In 2023, he was posthumously inducted into the Accounting Hall of Fame as its 115th inductee.
