= William Hopkins Holyland =

English accountant

William Hopkins Holyland

William Hopkins Holyland (1807-1882) was an English accountant. He is best known for having co-founded, with Samuel Lowell Price and Edwin Waterhouse, the accountancy practice of Price Waterhouse that now forms part of PricewaterhouseCoopers.

== Career ==
He first joined the firm of Coleman, Turquand, Youngs & Co. where he became an expert in liquidations and bankruptcies. He became friends with another clerk by the name of Edwin Waterhouse while working there. In 1865, he went into partnership with Samuel Lowell Price at an office at No. 13 Gresham Street in London, and then persuaded Price to recruit Waterhouse into the practice that is now famous.

Holyland retired in 1871.

He died 20 January 1882 at Hatch Gate, Horley, Sussex.
