= Price Waterhouse v Kwan =

Legal case

- Court: Court of Appeal of New Zealand
- Full case name: PRICE WATERHOUSE Appellant AND P KWAN AND OTHERS Respondents AND BETWEEN PRICE WATERHOUSE Appellant AND K D HUGHES per N M HUGHES Respondent
- Decided: 16 December 1999
- Citation: [2000] 3 NZLR 39
- Transcript: Court of Appeal judgment

Court membership
- Judges sitting: Gault J, Keith J, Tipping J

Keywords
- negligence

Price Waterhouse v Kwan [2000] 3 NZLR 39 is a cited case in New Zealand regarding liability for negligent misstatements.

== Background ==
Price Waterhouse were the auditors of a law firm. It was later claimed that Price Waterhouse were negligent in their audits resulting in them losing their investments.

== Held ==
As the purpose of the audits was for the protection of clients money, there was sufficient proximity to hold that PW owed them a duty of care, and were accordingly ordered to pay damages.

The previous ruling in the McLaren Maycroft & Co v Fletcher Development Co Ltd case was overturned.
