= McLaren Maycroft & Co v Fletcher Development Co Ltd =

- Court: Court of Appeal of New Zealand
- Full case name: McLaren Maycroft & Co v Fletcher Development Co Ltd
- Decided: 21 December 1972
- Citation: [1973] 2 NZLR 100

Case history
- Prior actions: Turner P, Richmond J, White

McLaren Maycroft & Co v Fletcher Development Co Ltd [1973] 2 NZLR 100 is a cited case in New Zealand regarding concurrent duties in contract and tort, ruling that in situations where there is a contract, the parties can not pursue any claim in tort. The decision was later overturned in Price Waterhouse v Kwan [2000].
