= Legal professional privilege in Australia =

Law protecting conversations between client and lawyer

In Australia, legal professional privilege (also referred to as client legal privilege) is a rule of law protecting communications between legal practitioners and their clients from disclosure under compulsion of court or statute. While the rule of legal professional privilege in Australia largely mirrors that of other Commonwealth jurisdictions, there are a number of notable qualifications and modifications to the privilege specific to Australia and its states, and contentious issues about the direction of the privilege.

== History ==
Legal professional privilege emerged in the 16th century in England; it was originally a privilege held by a lawyer rather than the lawyer's client.

Legal professional privilege in Australia developed from the English common law privilege.

The rationale for legal professional privilege in an Australian context has been explained in the following ways:

- encouraging full disclosure of information by a client to a lawyer;
- promoting compliance with the law by enabling lawyers to give full and considered advice on a client's legal obligations;
- discouraging litigation and encouraging alternative dispute resolution;
- protection of a client's privacy;
- protecting access to justice.

Michael Kirby has described legal professional privilege as an "important human right deserving of special protection for that reason".

The Australian Law Reform Commission has adopted the terminology 'client legal privilege', as opposed to 'legal professional privilege', on the basis the privilege is held by the client not the lawyer. 'Client legal privilege' is the terminology used in Commonwealth and state evidence statutes. However, the common law privilege remains almost universally described by courts as 'legal professional privilege'.

== Source of rule ==
Legal professional privilege in Australia is established by both the common law and various statutes. Both sources reflect the two limbs of legal professional privilege: advice privilege and litigation privilege.

=== Common law ===
Legal professional privilege has been described as an "important common law right" that is enforceable in equity. The Evidence Acts do not expressly alter the common law privilege.

The common law maintains a distinction between two limbs of legal professional privilege. Advice privilege refers to the protection of communications between a client and a lawyer for the purposes of the lawyer providing legal advice to the client. Litigation privilege refers to the protection of communications between a client, lawyer (and any third party) for the dominant purpose of anticipated or existing legal proceedings. The prior test of 'sole purpose,' as per Grant v Downs, limited a lawyer's ability to claim privilege on items that were not for the exclusive purpose of the client's case. The current dominant purpose test, while more complex, significantly broadens the scope of legal professional privilege, as defined in Esso Australia Resources Ltd v Commissioner of Taxation. There is, invariably, much overlap between the two limbs.

=== Statute ===
Sections 118 and 119 of the 'Evidence Act 1995' (Cth) provide that confidential communications created for the dominant purpose of providing legal advice or litigation are protected from disclosure to federal courts. Similar or identical provisions have been adopted in New South Wales and Tasmania. Legal professional privilege in the context of court proceedings is governed by the common law in the remaining Australian states.

== Scope and content of the privilege ==
=== Two limbs ===
The privilege protects two kinds of confidential communications between a client and his or her lawyer. The first kind is where the communications are confidential and made for the purposes of seeking or being provided with legal advice. The second kind is where the communications are made for the purpose of existing or reasonably contemplated judicial or quasi-judicial proceedings. These two limbs of the privilege are called the advice privilege and the litigation privilege.

== Current issues in Australian law concerning legal professional privilege ==
=== Waiver of privilege ===
Legal professional privilege is not absolute and it does not attach to a communication indefinitely. The privilege may be waived by the client, but not by the lawyer. Accordingly, a client's intentional or inadvertent actions in relation to their use of legal advice may preclude the client from asserting the privilege in future.

The High Court in Mann v Carnell established a test of 'inconsistency' to determine whether a client has waived legal professional privilege over a communication. That is, a client will have waived privilege where their conduct has been inconsistent with the maintenance of that privilege. The most common circumstance in which a client will be found to have waived a privilege include disclosing the full advice, or the conclusions, gist or substance of the advice, to a third party or the public at large. This raises particular problems for public figures seeking to justify a particular course of action by relying on legal advice. However, privilege is not waived if a disclosure of a communication was made under a "compulsion of law". An implied waiver of privilege can only occur when there is a voluntary disclosure of communication.

=== Privilege and in-house lawyers ===
One of the most unsettled areas of privilege law in Australia is the extent to which advice provided by in-house counsel is protected. In Telstra Corporation Limited v Minister for Communications, Information Technology and the Arts (No. 2), Justice Graham of the Federal Court of Australia refused a claim for privilege over advice provided by in-house counsel of Telstra, holding 'an in-house lawyer will lack the requisite measure of independence if his or her advice is at risk of being compromised by virtue of the nature of his employment relationship with his employer'. This created concerns in the legal community as to the extent that in-house legal advice is protected from disclosure to a court. Justice Graham did not set out any measures or criteria for determining when an in-house lawyer is sufficiently independent of his or her employer.

In Vance v Air Marshall McCormack, Justice Crispin of the Supreme Court of the Australian Capital Territory held that privilege only attached to advice provided by lawyers who had a right to practice. This judgment has substantial ramifications for in-house counsel who are not admitted solicitors.

Notwithstanding the above, there is no appellate authority on the extent to which legal professional privilege applies to advice provided by in-house counsel.

=== Privilege and quasi-judicial proceedings ===
There is conflicting authority on whether legal professional privilege applies to communications prepared for the purpose of non-judicial legal proceedings, such as in administrative tribunals or commissions of enquiry. These conflicts have generally not reached appellate level.

In Ingot Capital Investments v Macquarie Equity Capital Markets, Justice Bergin of the Supreme Court of New South Wales held that privilege did not apply to proceedings in the Administrative Appeals Tribunal. Justice Bergin's reasoning was that the AAT was not a court and stood outside the adversarial system of justice as an inquisitorial administrative body not bound by the rules of evidence.

The AAT itself departed from and strongly criticised Ingot in a decision handed down by Justice Downes in his capacity as President of the AAT. In Farnaby and Military Rehabilitation and Compensation Commission, Justice Downes held that the litigation limb of the privilege applied to AAT proceedings and took the step of directing all future claims for privilege in the AAT to be handled accordingly.

The ALRC recommends extending legal professional privilege to non-judicial proceedings.

=== ALRC inquiry ===
On 29 November 2006, Attorney-General Philip Ruddock asked the ALRC to inquire into legal professional privilege in the context of coercive information-gathering powers held by Commonwealth agencies. A Discussion Paper was released by the ALRC on 26 September 2007, noting the need for a clear and consistent approach to legal professional privilege in Australia and its states and territories.

=== Extension to tax advisers ===
In April 2011, Assistant Treasurer Bill Shorten announced a consultation on extending privilege to accountants providing tax advice, like their American counterparts.

== Other types of privileges ==
While the main perception of professional legal privilege is the client lawyer relationship some Australian States in particular NSW have extended this privilege to 'protected confidences' defined as "communication made by a person in confidence to another person .... in the course of a relationship in which the confidant was acting in a professional capacity". The Division in the Evidence Act 1995 (NSW) for 'Professional confidential relationship privilege' and how it is excluded or lost is at Division 1A This is often interpreted as being between a health professional and their patient. It may however, extend to confidential advice from social workers, and accountants.. NSW has also added a 'Sexual assault communications privilege' at Division 1B Therefore, when considering the access and adducing decisions for medical records that may also cover sexual assault records, the first consideration of course will be relevance, and then any NSW court or tribunal may exclude any evidence of either 'Professional confidential relationship privilege' or 'Sexual assault communications privilege' or both. These sections of the Act aimed to provide further restrictions and protections against oppressive discovery that can cause undue harm to a party in court and may dissuade them from seeking medical care or counselling or damage those relationships, see for example, R v A and B for an appeal on an application in a case for access to discovery across 'Professional confidential relationship privilege' and 'Sexual assault communications privilege' and how the exclusions are decided.

In some jurisdictions in Australia privilege may also extend to journalists, (Shield laws), and priests It may also be invoked in a Public interest, or Matters of State issue. Settlement Negotiations may also be privileged.

Spousal privilege is held to be non-existent in Australian Common Law. Though it may exist in statute

== See also ==
- Privilege (evidence)
- Confidentiality
- Duty of confidentiality
- Admissible evidence
- Accountant–client privilege
- Physician–patient privilege
- Priest–penitent privilege
- Reporters' Privilege
- Spousal privilege
- State Secrets Privilege
- Public Interest Immunity
- Royal Commission into the Management of Police Informants - Royal Commission into the situation where a barrister, Nicola Gobbo, provided information on their clients to Victoria Police
