= William Cooper (accountant) =

English accountant (1826–1871)

- Born: 1826
- Died: 1871 (aged 44–45)
- Occupation: Accountant

William Cooper (1826–1871) was an English accountant who founded the accountancy practice of Cooper Brothers, now a part of PricewaterhouseCoopers.

== Career ==
Cooper started his professional career as a clerk at Quilter, Ball & Co. In 1854, he left the firm to establish his own practice at No. 13 George Street in London. In 1858, his brother Arthur joined the practice and the name was changed to W. & A. Cooper. In 1860, the firm was renamed Cooper Brothers, a name that is now well-known in the accountancy world.

== Personal life ==
Cooper was the son of Emmanuel Cooper, an influential figure in the City of London and Deputy Chairman of London & County Bank.
