= Lewis Godden =

British stamp dealer and philatelist

Lewis Sidney Frank Godden MBE (1877 – 17 March 1954) was a British stamp dealer and philatelist who was added to the Roll of Distinguished Philatelists in 1946.

Godden was in business in The Strand, London, from 1912 and later joined by his son Frank Godden. The firm issued the monthly Godden's Gazette from 1933.

Lewis Godden organised philatelic section of British Empire Exhibition 1924.
