= Samuel Lowell Price =

English accountant (1821–1887)

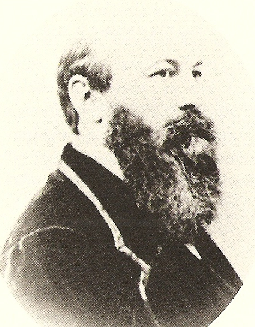
- Born: 1821
- Died: 1887 (aged 65–66)
- Occupation: accountant

Samuel Lowell Price (1821–1887) was an English accountant. He is best known for having co-founded, with William Hopkins Holyland and Edwin Waterhouse, the accountancy practice of Price Waterhouse that now forms part of PricewaterhouseCoopers.

== Career ==
He came from Bristol and was the son of a local stone potter. He went into the accountancy profession at an early age joining the local firm of Bradley, Barnard & Co. In 1848 he went into partnership with William Edwards but by 1849 that partnership had been dissolved. Later that year he became a sole practitioner at No. 5 Gresham Street running the firm that is now famous.

In 1865 he was joined by Holyland and Waterhouse at a new office at No. 13 Gresham Street and, as they became more active in the firm, he was then able to devote much of his time to the Institute of Accountants and then, when it was formed in 1880, the Institute of Chartered Accountants in England and Wales.

Price died in 1887.
