= Tom Seymour (chief executive) =

Former CEO of PwC Australia

Tom Seymour is the former CEO of PwC in Australia. He also served as PwC's Asia Pacific network and a part of the firm's Global Tax and legal leadership team.

== Education ==
Seymour attained a Bachelor of Commerce from the Queensland University of Technology and a Bachelor of Laws (Hons) from Bond University. After he graduated, Seymour joined the office of PwC on the Gold Coast in 1994 and became the CEO in March 2020.

Seymour is a Fellow of the Institute of Chartered Accountants in Australia.

== PwC tax scandal ==
In January 2023, PwC faced a scandal as Australia's Tax Practitioners Board banned Peter-John Collins, PwC's former head of international tax, for sharing confidential Treasury meeting details about new laws designed to curb tax avoidances with fellow PwC employees. Earlier in May, the Senate committee revealed through emails that PwC had used the confidential information provided by Collins, who signed strict non-disclosure agreements, to advise its clients and win new business. Seymour, who was managing Collins when he ran the Australian arm of PwC's tax division, admitted that he was among the several partners who received emails regarding the financial success of the tax advice in 2015 and 2016.

The emails revealed the sharing of confidential information with colleagues in the United Kingdom, Ireland, and the United States. They also contained praises for the "accuracy" of Collins’ advice in winning millions of dollars' worth of new business in North America as well as with the other PwC offices around the world, including in the United States, Netherlands and Singapore.

Seymour initially planned to retire in September but resigned three days after admitting his knowledge about the controversial strategy of the international tax advisory practice in Australia.

Following Seymour's resignation, Kristin Stubbins was appointed as the Acting CEO for PwC Australia until her resignation in October, 2023.

== Award ==
Seymour received the Robert Stable Medal at the 2022 Bond University Alumni Awards.
