= Legal professional privilege in England and Wales =

In England and Wales, the principle of legal professional privilege has long been recognised by the common law. It is seen as a fundamental principle of justice, and grants a protection from disclosing evidence. It is a right that attaches to the client (not to the lawyer) and so may only be waived by the client.

The majority of English civil cases are subject to the rules of standard disclosure, which are set out by the Civil Procedure Rules 1998 (the CPR) Rule 31.6. A party makes disclosure of a document by stating that the document exists or has existed.

The right to inspect documents in English civil procedure is governed by CPR Part 31.15. Upon written notice, the party to whom a document has been disclosed has the right to inspect that document (if such inspection would be proportionate given the nature of the case) except where the party making disclosure has the right to withhold inspection.

The Proceeds of Crime Act 2002 (PoCA) requires solicitors (and accountants, insolvency practitioners, etc.) who suspect their clients of money laundering (in effect any handling or involvement with any proceeds of any crime, or monies or assets representing the proceeds of crime, can be a money laundering offence in English law) to report them to the authorities without telling the clients they have done so, subject to a maximum punishment of 5 years in jail. However, the Court of Appeal confirmed in 2005 that PoCA does not override legal professional privilege.

== The general nature of legal professional privilege ==
Legal professional privilege is the principal reason why inspection of documents is refused, and is regarded as a fundamental principle of justice. It is an exception to the general cards on the table outlook of the CPR. Privilege discloses a substantive right to keep privileged material confidential not only in the context of litigation, but generally. Privilege extends beyond a mere evidential rule, and has been regarded as a fundamental principle of justice:

The client must be sure that what he tells his lawyer in confidence will never be revealed without his consent. Legal profession privilege is thus much more than an ordinary rule of evidence, limited in its application to the facts of a particular case. It is a fundamental condition on which the administration of justice as a whole rests.

It is a fundamental human right recognised by the English common law, and by the European Court of Human Rights, which has held it to be part of the right to privacy guaranteed by Article 8 of the Convention.

Privilege is absolute, in the sense that once it is established, it may not be weighed against any other countervailing public interest factor, but may only be overridden expressly by statute.

== The scope of legal professional privilege ==
There are two forms of legal professional privilege:

- Legal advice privilege protects confidential communications between lawyers and their clients for the purposes of giving or obtaining legal advice.
- Litigation privilege protects confidential communications among lawyers, clients and third parties made for the purposes of litigation, either actual or contemplated.

== General requirements for privilege ==
To be regarded as privileged, the communications must be confidential. Communications between a client and his solicitor which the client instructed his solicitor to repeat to the other party are not privileged, because such communications are not confidential. It is necessary that the solicitor or barrister be consulted professionally and not in any other capacity.

Privilege does not extend to facts communicated by the solicitor to the client which cannot be the subject of a confidential communication, even though such facts have a relation to the client's case.

== Requirements for legal advice privilege ==
For legal advice privilege to apply, the communications in question must be between a professional legal adviser and their client with the sole or dominant purpose of giving or obtaining legal advice. The Court of Appeal judgement in Three Rivers No. 5, regarding the narrow construction of 'client' in the case of corporate clients, was not appealed and remains good, if controversial, law in England and Wales. In this case a group of employees of the corporate client had the specific delegated authority to seek and receive legal advice on behalf of the corporate client. Communications not exclusively between those specific individuals with delegated authority and the legal advisers, was not covered by legal advice privilege, even where the dominant purpose of these secondary communications was for receiving legal advice. The status of communications between individuals all with jointly delegated authority to seek and receive legal advice has yet to be tested, it may be that the "dominant purpose" test would apply to such internal communications between individuals jointly identified as the "client".

Legal advice privilege extends to advice from salaried (in-house) legal advisers employed by government departments or commercial companies as much as from barristers and solicitors in private practice. The law does not regard the position of these employed legal advisors as being different from those in private practice:

They are, no doubt, servants or agents of the employer. For that reason [the first-instance judge] thought they were in a different position from other legal advisers who are in private practice. I do not think this is correct. They are regarded by the law as in every respect in the same position as those who practice on their own account. The only difference is that they act for one client only, and not for several clients. They must uphold the same standards of honour and etiquette. They are subject to the same duties to their client and to the court. They must respect the same confidences. They and their clients have the same privileges. ... I speak, of course [only] of their communications in the capacity of legal advisers.

— Lord Denning

Legal advice privilege also applies to communications with foreign lawyers, where the necessary relationship of lawyer and client exists. It does not extend to advisors who are not legally qualified or to communications with members of other professions.

All statements made at joint consultations between parties and their respective solicitors and counsel, even though made by one party to the solicitor or counsel of the other party, are privileged. So are communications made in a professional capacity for the purpose of giving or receiving professional advice, including information received by a solicitor in a professional capacity from a third party and communicated to the client.

The test for legal advice privilege is to establish whether the communication in question was made confidentially for the purpose of legal advice – construing such purposes broadly. That breadth was emphasized by the House of Lords, which has stated that the policy justification for legal advice privilege rests not simply on the right of the individual to obtain confidential legal advice, but also on the public interest in the observance of law and the administration of justice. The House therefore decided that legal advice privilege was to be given the scope commensurate with these wide policy considerations. To achieve this end, legal advice could not be narrowly construed to be limited to advice on the client's legal rights and liabilities. It would be broadly construed, to include advice as to what should prudently and sensibly be done in the relevant legal context. Where there was doubt about the relevant legal context, the court should ask (a) whether the advice related to the rights, liabilities, obligations or remedies of the client under either private or public law; and, if so, (b) whether the communication fell within the policy justification for the privilege.

== Requirements for litigation privilege ==
In contrast to legal advice privilege (where the relevant category of communications is broadly-construed), for litigation privilege to apply, communications to and from a professional legal adviser or third party (or between them) must take place in the context of, and for the sole or dominant purpose of, actual or contemplated litigation. The litigation must be adversarial in nature (as opposed to inquisitorial or investigative). However, litigation privilege does not extend to cover documents obtained for the purpose of litigation if they came into existence before litigation was contemplated.

Communication not only with legal advisers but with other agents for the purpose of existing litigation or litigation then in contemplation are privileged if the document comes into existence at the request or on behalf of the legal advisor or for the purpose of obtaining his advice or to enable him to prosecute the litigation.

== Beneficiaries of litigation privilege ==
Litigation privilege is only engaged in the context of adversarial proceedings, which excludes investigative or inquisitorial proceedings, such as family law care proceedings. For the purpose of legal advice privilege, the term client does not extend to documents produced by employees for the purpose of being sent to the client's solicitor.

== Waiver of privilege ==
In both categories of privilege (legal advice privilege and litigation privilege) the privilege is that of the client, not of the lawyer or of the third party. Thus, only the client may waive privilege.

Legal professional privilege may be waived unilaterally by the client. This should be contrasted with the privilege which attaches to without prejudice correspondence, which may not be waived without the consent of both parties. A document in respect of which privilege is waived in one action cannot necessarily be used by the opposite party in a subsequent action between the same litigants unless the privilege is once again waived.

The reading out of part of a document by counsel at trial, even without the client's express authority, amounts to a waiver of any privilege attaching to the document as a whole; however, mere reference to a document does not amount to a waiver of privilege. Following the rule of indivisibility of waiver, the disclosure of part of a letter pursuant to a general order for discovery constitutes a waiver of privilege in respect of the whole contents of the letter.

== Other parties and other proceedings ==
A third party is not in general entitled to rely on a defendant's privilege in relation to a document which came into existence for the purpose of enabling the defendant to obtain legal advice pending litigation unless there is some common interest between the defendant and the third party. However, there is an overriding principle that a defendant or potential defendant must be free to seek such evidence without being obliged to disclose the result of his finding to his opponent. Consequently, where a memorandum was prepared by a third party at the request of a potential defendant to enable him to obtain legal advice, the court would not order the third party to disclose the memorandum to the plaintiff, even though the third party was not at the time a potential defendant and was in effect sheltering the defendant's privilege.

The court may not order disclosure of documents held by solicitors on behalf of clients who are not parties to the action if neither the solicitors nor the clients were involved in any relevant wrongdoing.

Legal advice tendered to a party, and thus privileged in the hands of that party, may nevertheless be discoverable to another party which has a common interest with the party holding the documents such that the party claiming discovery falls within the ambit of the confidence subject to which the advice was tendered.

== Fraud nullifies privilege ==
Confidential communications between a client and his legal adviser are not privileged if made for the purpose of committing a fraud or crime. For these purposes, it is irrelevant whether the fraud is that of the client, the adviser or a third party acting through an innocent client. Fraud in this context is a wide concept extending to iniquity, which embraces, for example, a plan to enter into transactions at an undervalue to prejudice the client's creditors. However, disclosure of such documents in such circumstances will only be ordered by a court if a particularly strong prima facie case of fraud is shown.

== Tax advice ==
Lawyers are protected by professional privilege from having to disclose advice that they may provide on clients' tax matters. In contrast, and unlike their American counterparts, British accountants do not enjoy such privilege, and are under general obligations to make disclosures to HM Revenue and Customs. The Chairman of HMRC in February 2010 criticised lawyers who exploited this difference to compete with accountants for clients, saying that he would crush any instances of law firms saying "bring your tax issues to us so we can ensure that HMRC can never get access to them".

In July 2010, the legal professional privilege was the subject of a Court of Appeal case, in which Prudential plc claimed that it should not have to disclose tax advice received from accountants PricewaterhouseCoopers. The Institute of Chartered Accountants in England and Wales (ICAEW) intervened in support of change, but the court's judgment in October rejected the extension of privilege to professions other than law.

== See also ==
- Accountant-client privilege
- Priest-penitent privilege
- Reporters' privilege
- State secrets privilege
- Admissible evidence
- Public-interest immunity
- Right to silence
