= Physician–patient privilege =

Protection against medical patient details in court

Physician–patient privilege is a legal concept, related to medical confidentiality, that protects communications between a patient and their doctor from being used against the patient in court. It is a part of the rules of evidence in many common law jurisdictions. Almost every jurisdiction that recognizes physician–patient privilege permits a physician not to testify in court about medical information about their patient, either by statute or through case law, and limits the privilege to knowledge acquired during the course of providing medical services. In some jurisdictions, conversations between a patient and physician may be privileged in both criminal and civil courts.

== Scope ==
The privilege may cover the situation where a patient confesses to a psychiatrist that they committed a particular crime. It may also cover normal inquiries regarding matters such as injuries that may result in civil action. For example, any defendant that the patient may be suing at the time cannot ask the doctor if the patient ever expressed the belief that their condition had improved. However, the rule generally does not apply to confidences shared with physicians when they are not serving in the role of medical providers.

The reasoning behind the rule is that a level of trust must exist in the doctor–patient relationship so that the physician can properly treat the patient. If the patient were fearful of telling the truth to the physician because they believed the physician would report such behavior to the authorities, the treatment process could be rendered far more difficult, or the physician could make an incorrect diagnosis.

For example, a below-age of consent patient came to a doctor with a sexually transmitted disease. The doctor is usually required to obtain a list of the patient's sexual contacts to inform them that they need treatment. This is an important health concern. However, the patient may be reluctant to divulge the names of their older sexual partners, for fear that they will be charged with statutory rape. In some jurisdictions, the doctor cannot be forced to reveal the information revealed by their patient to anyone except to particular organizations, as specified by law, and they too are required to keep that information confidential. In the case the police become aware of such information, they are not allowed to use it in court as proof of the sexual misconduct except as provided by express intent of the legislative body and formalized into law.

The law in Ontario, Canada, requires that physicians report patients who, in the opinion of the physician, may be unfit to drive for medical reasons as per Section 203 of the Highway Traffic Act.

The law in New Hampshire places physician–patient communications on the same basis as attorney–client communications, except in cases where law enforcement officers seek blood or urine test samples and test results taken from a patient who is being investigated for driving while intoxicated.

== United States ==
In the United States, the Federal Rules of Evidence do not recognize doctor–patient privilege.

At the state level, the extent of the privilege varies depending on the law of the applicable jurisdiction. For example, in Texas there is only a limited physician–patient privilege in criminal proceedings, and the privilege is limited in civil cases as well.

== Australia ==
In New South Wales, Australia, a privilege exists for "communication made by a person in confidence to another person [...] in the course of a relationship in which the confidant was acting in a professional capacity". This is often interpreted as being between a health professional and their patient.

In some jurisdictions in Australia privilege may also extend to lawyers, some victims, journalists (source protection), and priests. It may also be invoked in a public interest, or settlement negotiations, which may also be privileged.

== England and Wales ==
Unlike legal professional privilege that applies between lawyers and clients, there is no privilege between a doctor and patient under the laws of England and Wales.

Doctors act under a duty of confidentiality to patients and the General Medical Council publishes guidelines on confidentiality that covers both the legal obligations and ethical duties of doctors towards patients. Public interest exceptions to the duty of confidentiality apply when it is necessary to protect third parties from serious harm, for notification of serious communicable diseases to others at risk, for safeguarding of vulnerable persons or those lacking capacity under the Mental Capacity Act 2005, and prevention of terrorism under the Terrorism Act 2000.

Data about a person's health is treated as special category data under the General Data Protection Regulation (applied in the UK with the Data Protection Act 2018). The National Health Service Act 2006 also defines a category of "protected information" and sets restrictions on the disclosure of such information in the context of legal proceedings.

== See also ==
- Privilege (evidence)
- Attorney–client privilege
- Doctor–patient relationship
- Medical privacy
- Priest–penitent privilege
- Subpoena duces tecum
- Subpoena ad testificandum
