= Fieldfisher =

Law firms based in London

Fieldfisher LLP
- Headquarters: London, United Kingdom
- No. of offices: 28
- No. of lawyers: Approx. 1,200
- No. of employees: Approx. 2,200
- Major practice areas: General practice
- Key people: Robert Shooter (Managing Partner); David Wilkinson (Senior Partner)
- Revenue: £290 million (2020/21)
- Profit per equity partner: £860,000 (2019/20)
- Date founded: 1835 (Field Roscoe & Co.); 1865 (Waterhouse & Co.); 1969 (merger of Field Roscoe and TF Peacock Fisher); 1989 (merger of Field Fisher Martineau and Waterhouse & Co.)
- Company type: Limited liability partnership
- Website: www.fieldfisher.com

Fieldfisher LLP is a multinational law firm headquartered in London. The firm has 28 offices located in countries around the world and advises national and multinational corporations, financial institutions and governments. Fieldfisher is also known for its Alternative Legal Services (ALS) operations, in areas such as contract management and financial trading documentation.

== History ==
=== Origins to 2000 ===
The origins of Fieldfisher can be traced back to the founding of the law firm Field Roscoe & Co. by Edwin Wilkins Field in 1835. In 1865, Theodore Waterhouse founded Waterhouse & Co. In 1897, Charles Fisher started his articles with Thomas Peacock, which later became TF Peacock Fisher. In 1930, Field Roscoe merged with Treherne Higgins. In 1969, Field Roscoe and TF Peacock Fisher merged to form Field Fisher & Co.

In 1972, Field Fisher & Co. merged with Martineau and Reid to become Field Fisher Martineau. Field Fisher Waterhouse was created in 1989 by the merger of Field Fisher Martineau and Waterhouse & Co.

In 1998, Field Fisher Waterhouse merged with media and communications firm Allison & Humphreys to complement its IT and internet expertise. The BBC was one of the key clients that A&H lawyers brought to the firm.

=== 2000 to present ===
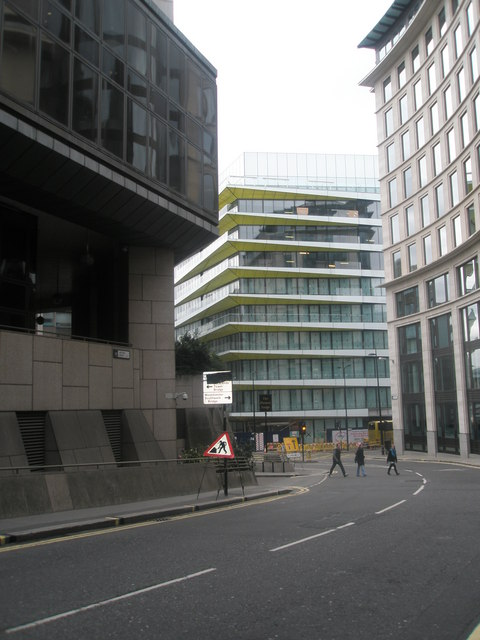
Fieldfisher's head office at Swan Lane in London (building in the background)

In June 2006, Field Fisher Waterhouse converted to LLP status. In 2007, the firm took its first steps into Europe; in April offices were established in Brussels and Hamburg, and in November an office in Paris was opened. The firm subsequently opened additional German offices in Munich and Düsseldorf.

In September 2012, the firm opened its first US office in Palo Alto, California. On 1 April 2014, the firm merged with the Manchester-based law firm Heatons.

In May 2014, the firm was renamed Fieldfisher.

Between 2015 and 2016, Fieldfisher represented BES Utilities and its owner Andrew Pilley in a number of actions including threatening libel proceedings against former customers, employees and Trading Standards' prosecuting authority Cheshire West and Chester Council. After the wholesale failure of the claim, Pilley was found guilty on 4 accounts of fraud and sentenced to 13 years imprisonment. Shortly after, Partner Bill Lister was dismissed from Fieldfisher.

In July 2016, Fieldfisher merged with the Italian law firm Studio Associato Servizi Professionali Integrati, which had offices in Milan, Rome, Venice and Turin. SASPI changed its name to Fieldfisher upon completion of the merger.

In November 2016, Fieldfisher merged with the Birmingham-based commercial law firm Hill Hofstetter. The same month, Fieldfisher merged with the Beijing-based law firm JS Partners.

In May 2017, Fieldfisher launched an Amsterdam office and in 2018 it opened in Frankfurt, Luxembourg and Belfast.

Fieldfisher merged with Spanish firm JAUSAS in September 2018, to add Madrid and Barcelona to its network of offices and form Fieldfisher JAUSAS. In November 2021, the firm's Spanish office dropped JAUSAS to become Fieldfisher Spain.

In May 2019, it was announced the firm had merged with Irish law firm McDowell Purcell, effective 1 May 2019.

In February 2022, Fieldfisher announced the opening of a new office in Berlin to house its new mass litigation and operations business, Fieldfisher X.

The firm's Chinese, Italian, Netherlands and Spanish operations are structured as Swiss Vereins.

Alternative Legal Services

Fieldfisher operates a number of Alternative Legal Services (ALS) operations under a variety of sub-brands.

In January 2017, Fieldfisher launched CondorALS, a platform specialising in document negotiation and contract management with a regulatory focus, particularly in the financial services sector. In October 2017, CondorALS was named the winner of the FT Innovative Lawyers Award for 'New Business and Service Delivery Models'. In March 2018, CondorALS was expanded through the formation of a new partnership with Integreon, a global alternative legal services provider.

In November 2017, Fieldfisher announced a strategic partnership with Donaldson Legal Consulting in Belfast, to provide financial trading documentation, negotiation and associated services to financial institutions, corporations and asset managers. DLC was incorporated into a new limited liability partnership, Donaldson Legal Consulting LLP, led by Alison Donaldson as managing partner.

In January 2018, Fieldfisher set up subsidiary law firm, Roscoe Reid, a B2C law firm focusing on group litigation. Roscoe Reid is pursuing equal pay claims against large UK retailers, including Morrisons and Boots. In September 2021, Roscoe Reid obtained a decision at Leeds Employment Tribunal that more than 2,300 of Morrisons' retail workers who are mostly women can rely on the supermarket's distribution centre workers as comparators in their claims for equal pay.
