= Accountant–client privilege =

Accountant–client privilege is a confidentiality privilege, or more precisely, a group of privileges, available in American federal and state law. Accountant–client privileges may be classified in two categories: evidentiary privileges and non-evidentiary privileges.

An evidentiary privilege is one that may as a general rule be successfully asserted in a court of law. A non-evidentiary privilege is (A) one that may not be maintained in a court of law, or (B) one which is, according to the terms of the statute granting the privilege, not applicable in the face of an order from the court compelling disclosure of the communication for which the privilege is claimed. The evidentiary and non-evidentiary versions of the accountant-client privilege are, as a general rule, creations of Federal or state statute.

Under English common law, on which American law is based, there was generally no accountant–client privilege. In the United Kingdom in particular the Proceeds of Crime Act 2002 actually requires accountants (and solicitors, insolvency practitioners, etc.) who suspect their clients of tax evasion to report them to the authorities without telling the clients they have done so, subject to a maximum punishment of 14 years in jail. This affects even accountants who uncover a possibly inadvertent claim for expenses. In Canada, the Federal Court of Appeal took note of the American policy but refused to give any weight to it on the grounds that it is for Parliament to choose to enact a similar rule in Canada.

== Non-evidentiary accountant–client privileges ==
Some states have enacted a non-evidentiary accountant–client privilege.

For example, Texas has a privilege rule that requires that a certified public accountant (CPA) not voluntarily disclose information communicated to the CPA by a client in connection with the engagement without the client's permission. The privilege generally does not apply, however, in the case of an administrative summons by the Internal Revenue Service under 26 U.S.C. § 7602, in the case of a summons under the Securities Exchange Act of 1934, or in the case of a court order.

== The federally authorized tax practitioner privilege ==
The federally authorized tax practitioner privilege, is a limited evidentiary privilege available in American federal tax law. The privilege is defined in an amendment to the Internal Revenue Code made by the Internal Revenue Service Restructuring and Reform Act of 1998:

With respect to tax advice, the same common law protections of confidentiality which apply to a communication between a taxpayer and an attorney shall also apply to a communication between a taxpayer and any federally authorized tax practitioner to the extent the communication would be considered a privileged communication if it were between a taxpayer and an attorney.

Under the law, the term "federally authorized tax practitioner" (or FATP) means an individual authorized under Federal law to practice before the Internal Revenue Service where the practice is subject to Federal regulation under 31 U.S.C. § 330. The term 'tax advice' means advice given by an individual with respect to a matter that is within the scope of the individual's authority to practice.

There are, however, some significant limitations on the FATP privilege.

=== Not applicable in criminal proceedings or state law matters ===
Unlike the attorney–client privilege, the FATP privilege does not apply in criminal matters, and does not apply in state tax proceedings. The privilege may be asserted only in a "noncriminal tax matter before the Internal Revenue Service" and a "noncriminal tax proceeding in Federal court brought by or against the United States."

=== Effect of date of the communication on availability of the FATP privilege ===
The FATP privilege applies only to communications made on or after July 22, 1998. The privilege does not apply to any written communication before October 22, 2004, between a federally authorized tax practitioner and a director, shareholder, officer, employee, agent, or representative of a corporation in connection with the promotion of the direct or indirect participation of such corporation in any tax shelter. Section 7525 was amended by the American Jobs Creation Act of 2004, so that the privilege does not apply to written communications made on or after October 22, 2004, involving a federally-authorized tax practitioner with respect to the participation of any person (not just a corporation) in a tax shelter. This is a further limitation of the privilege.

=== The practitioner ===
The term FATP includes an attorney, a CPA, an enrolled agent, or an enrolled actuary. The FATP privilege does not generally apply to accountants who are not CPAs or EAs (unless they qualify as enrolled actuaries).

The FATP privilege might not apply to certified public accountants who are not licensed to practice in the state in which the client lives (for example, in a situation where the client lives in New Jersey but works in New York, where he consults a CPA who is licensed in New York but not in New Jersey). Because the CPA is not licensed to practice in the state where the client resides, the communication might not qualify for the privilege.

=== Tax advice versus business advice ===
The FATP privilege applies only to tax advice. The advice must be treated as confidential by both the accountant and the client to be covered by the privilege. If the communication is divulged to third parties, then it is not confidential. The privilege does not cover general business consultations or personal financial planning advice.

=== Tax return preparation ===
With respect to communications involved in the preparation of tax returns, there is a split of authority. Much of the relevant case law was rendered prior to the creation of the FATP privilege in 1998, and relates to the attorney–client privilege.

Most of the case law indicates that a communication in connection with tax return preparation is not covered. Under the argument accepted by the U.S. Court of Appeals for the Ninth Circuit, communication pertinent merely to preparing a tax return does not involve giving or receiving legal advice (see e.g., United States v. Gurtner). The United States Court of Appeals for the Eighth Circuit, meanwhile, has held that tax returns are not privileged. This holding is based on the rationale that tax returns are intended for disclosure to a third party, i.e., the Internal Revenue Service, so there can be no expectation of confidentiality, which defeats a claim that the return or pertinent communication is privileged.

One minority view finds the privilege might apply to a communication about what to claim on a return. Another minority view is that such communications could be considered "legal" advice.

On balance, however, the weight of authority is that communication in connection with tax return preparation is probably not protected by the privilege.

== See also ==
- Attorney–client privilege
