= PwC =

Multinational professional services brand

PricewaterhouseCoopers International Limited
- Trade name: PwC
- Type: Members have different legal structures; both UK and US firms are limited liability partnerships
- Industry: Professional services
- Founded: 1998 (PricewaterhouseCoopers); 1849 (Price Waterhouse); 1854 (Coopers & Lybrand)
- Founders: Samuel Lowell Price; Edwin Waterhouse; William Cooper; Robert Hiester Montgomery; William M. Lybrand
- Headquarters: London, England, UK
- Area served: Worldwide
- Key people: Mohamed Kande (chairman)
- Services: Assurance; Data and analytics Digital Transformation; Financial advisory Forensic accounting Legal services Management consulting Risk advisory Risk assurance Tax advisory
- Revenue: ▲US$55.4 billion (2024)
- Number of employees: 370,000 (2024)
- Website: pwc.com

PricewaterhouseCoopers, also known as PwC, is a British multinational professional services network based in London, England.

It is the second-largest professional services network in the world and is one of the Big Four accounting firms, along with Deloitte, EY and KPMG. The PwC network is overseen by PricewaterhouseCoopers International Limited (PwCI), an English private company limited by guarantee, which is responsible for managing the global brand, setting strategy and overseeing common standards.

PwC operates in 149 countries, with a global workforce of more than 370,000 people (as of FY 2024). As of 2019, 26% of the workforce was based in the Americas, 26% in Asia, 32% in Western Europe, and 5% in Middle East and Africa. The company's global revenues were US$55.4 billion in FY 2024, of which $19.5 billion was generated by its Assurance practice, $12.6 billion by its Tax and Legal practice and $23.3 billion by its Advisory practice.

The firm in its recent actual form was created in 1998 by a merger between two accounting firms: Coopers & Lybrand, and Price Waterhouse. Both firms had histories dating back to the 19th century. The trading name was shortened to PwC in September 2010 as part of a rebranding effort. In April 2025, PwC shut down its operations in nine African countries.

The firm has been embroiled in a number of corruption controversies and crime scandals. The firm has on multiple occasions been implicated in tax fraud and tax avoidance practices. It has frequently been fined by regulators for performing audits that fail to meet auditing standards.

== History ==
=== Coopers & Lybrand ===
In 1854, William Cooper founded an accountancy practice at No. 13 George Street in London. It became Cooper Brothers seven years later when his three brothers joined.

In 1898, Robert H. Montgomery, William M. Lybrand, Adam A. Ross Jr. and his brother T. Edward Ross formed Lybrand, Ross Brothers and Montgomery in the United States.

In 1957, Cooper Brothers, along with Lybrand, Ross Bros & Montgomery and a Canadian firm (McDonald, Currie and Co.), agreed to adopt the name Coopers & Lybrand in international practice.

In 1973, the three member firms in the UK, US and Canada changed their names to Coopers & Lybrand. Then in 1980, Coopers & Lybrand expanded its expertise in insolvency substantially by acquiring Cork Gully, a leading firm in that field in the UK. In 1990, in certain countries, including the UK, Coopers & Lybrand merged with Deloitte, Haskins & Sells to become Coopers & Lybrand Deloitte; in 1992 it reverted to Coopers & Lybrand.

The firm relocated from George Street to modern offices designed by Dennis Lennon & Partners at Plumtree Court in 1985, and then moved to new offices designed by Terry Farrell at Embankment Place in 1994.

=== Price Waterhouse ===
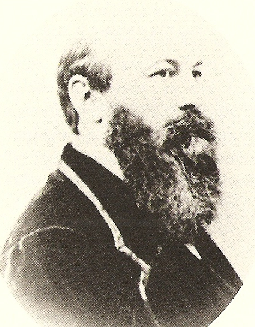
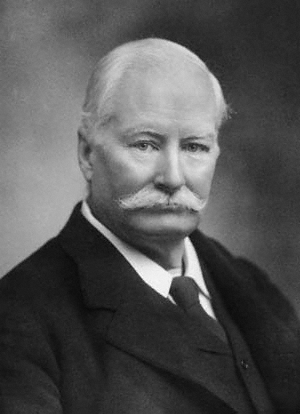
Samuel Price (left) and Edwin Waterhouse (right)

In 1849, Samuel Lowell Price, an accountant, founded an accountancy practice at No. 5 Gresham Street in London. In 1865, Price went into partnership with William Hopkins Holyland and Edwin Waterhouse at No. 13 Gresham Street. Holyland left shortly afterwards to work alone in accountancy and the firm was known from 1874 as Price, Waterhouse & Co. The firm was based at No. 3, Frederick's Place in Old Jewry in London from 1899.

By the late 19th century, Price Waterhouse had gained recognition as an accounting firm. It opened an office in New York City in 1890, and the American firm expanded. The original British firm opened an office in Liverpool in 1904, and then elsewhere in the United Kingdom and worldwide, each time establishing a separate partnership in each country: the worldwide practice of Price Waterhouse was, therefore, a federation of collaborating firms that had grown organically, rather than the result of an international merger.

The firm relocated from Frederick's Place to modern offices at Southwark Towers in London Bridge Street in 1975. The original partnership agreement, signed by Price, Holyland, and Waterhouse could be found in the new offices there.

In a further effort to take advantage of economies of scale, PW and Arthur Andersen discussed a merger in 1989 but the negotiations failed, mainly because of conflicts of interest such as Andersen's strong commercial links with IBM and PW's audit of IBM, as well as the two firms' radically different cultures. It was said by those involved with the failed merger that at the end of the discussion, the partners at the table realized they had different views of business, and the potential merger was scrapped.

=== 1998 to present ===
In 1998, Price Waterhouse and Coopers & Lybrand merged to form PricewaterhouseCoopers (written with a lowercase "w" and a camel case "C"). At that time, MCS was the largest and fastest growing division.

The fallout from the Enron, Worldcom and other financial auditing scandals led to the demise of Arthur Andersen, reducing the count of the Big Five accounting firms down to the Big Four and spurring passage of the 2002 Sarbanes–Oxley Act (SOX). Among other restrictions, SOX severely limited the overlap between management consulting and auditing services.

Around July 2000, PwC began to prepare for either an acquisition or IPO by developing separate financial records that would be required for due diligence. PwC leadership began to seek buyers, with an initial interest by Hewlett-Packard for a reported $17 billion, but negotiations broke down in 2000. Almost a year after the collapse of Arthur Andersen in 2001, Arthur Andersen, LLP affiliates in Hong Kong and mainland China completed talks to join PricewaterhouseCoopers, China.

In 2000, PwC acquired Canada's largest SAP consulting partner, Omnilogic Systems, to expand its developing consulting presence in Canada. PwC announced in May 2002 that PwC Consulting would be spun off as an independent entity and filed with the SEC for an initial $1B IPO to trade in August. Because PwC accounting partners owned 60% of PwC Consulting, an IPO or acquisition was seen as the only way to split the two firms without decimating the consulting arm's working capital.

PwC Consulting leadership continued to fluff financials by expanding across-the-board pay cuts, terminating its variable compensation program, and furthering deep layoffs, all rare actions in the industry. In June 2002, PwC Consulting hired Continental Airlines' Greg Brennerman as CEO to run the global division.

A week later, it was announced that an outside consultancy, Wolff Olins, had created new branding for the consulting group, called "Monday". The firm's CEO, Greg Brenneman described the unusual name as "a real word, concise, recognizable, global and the right fit for a company that works hard to deliver results."

In July 2002, it was rumoured that PwC was in talks with an unknown public company, as no PR space or announcement for the impending IPO had been set. Those rumours were confirmed in August 2002, when PwC announced it sold Monday to IBM for approximately $3.5 billion in cash and stock. Monday was consolidated into IBM Global Business Services while partners became employees for the first time. The acquisition had a modest increase in the size and capabilities of IBM's growing consulting practice, as IBM had 150,000 employees at the time. At the same time, Monday carried just 30,000 at the time. However, it was seen as a win by IBM since PwC Consulting/Monday's valuation had suffered after the post-9/11 recession.

PwC began rebuilding its consulting practice with acquisitions such as Paragon Consulting Group and the commercial services business of BearingPoint in 2009. The firm continued this process by acquiring Diamond Management & Technology Consultants in November 2010, and PRTM in August 2011. In 2012, the firm acquired Logan Tod & Co, a digital analytics and optimisation consultancy, and Ant's Eye View, a social media strategy development and consulting firm to build upon PwC's growing Management Consulting customer impact and customer engagement capabilities.

In April 2014, Booz & Company combined with PwC to form Strategy&. In 2013, PwC acquired BGT Partners. In 2016, PwC acquired technology/consulting firm NSI DMCC. In January 2017, PwC announced a five-year agreement with GE to provide managed tax services to GE on a global basis, transferring more than 600 of GE's in-house global tax team to PwC.

In November 2017, PwC accepted bitcoin as payment for advisory services, the first time the company, or any of the Big Four accounting firms, accepted virtual currency as payment. Veritas Capital acquired PwC's US public sector business in 2018, and branded the new company as Guidehouse. The Academy of Motion Picture Arts and Sciences (AMPAS) has utilized the services of PwC to tally the votes for the Academy Awards since 1935.

In addition, the company oversees AMPAS elections, prepares its financial documents, and is responsible for the group's tax filings. In 2023, PwC acquired Surfaceink, a hardware designer.

In May 2024, PwC became ChatGPT Enterprise's biggest customer and will also start reselling OpenAI's service for other large businesses.

== Operations ==
PwC refers to the PwC network and/or one or more of its member firms, each of which is a separate legal entity due to local legislative requirements. Much like other professional services firms, each member firm is financially and legally independent. PwC is co-ordinated by a private company limited by guarantee under English law, called PricewaterhouseCoopers International Limited. In addition, PwC is registered as a multidisciplinary entity which also provides legal services.

PwC is organized into three service lines:

- Assurance – Assurance services are those typically associated with financial audits.
- Advisory – Advisory services offered by PwC include two actuarial consultancy departments; Actuarial and Insurance Management Solutions (AIMS) and a sub branch of "Human Resource Services" (HRS). Actuarial covers mainly 5 areas: pensions, life insurance, non-life insurance, health, and investments. AIMS deals with life and non-life insurance and investments, while HRS deals mainly with pensions and group health. PwC has also expanded into digital media and advertising.
- Tax – International tax planning

PwC firms are in 140 countries, with 370,000 people.

=== Logo history ===
In September 2010, a new logo, designed by Wolff Olins, was introduced to reflect the new PwC trading name.

PwC's current logo was introduced in April 2025, featuring the new orange 'momentum mark'. This smaller and simpler design is said to be more fit for digital and online uses.

The Coopers & Lybrand logo prior to the 1998 merger

The Price Waterhouse logo prior to the 1998 merger

The PricewaterhouseCoopers logo from 1998 to 2010

The PwC logo from 2010 to 2025

The PwC logo since 2025

== Litigation ==
The firm has been embroiled in a number of corruption controversies and major criminal investigations as well as tax evasion and avoidance scandals. It has even aided war criminals in evading financial sanctions. PwC has also often performed faulty audits, vouching for the good financial health of companies without following basic auditing standards.

=== Gender employment discrimination ===
In 1989, the United States Supreme Court held that Price Waterhouse must prove by a preponderance of the evidence that the decision regarding Ann Hopkins's employment would have been the same if sex discrimination had not occurred. The accounting firm failed to prove that the same decision to postpone Hopkins's promotion to the partnership would have still been made in the absence of sex discrimination, and therefore, the employment decision constituted sex discrimination under Title VII of the Civil Rights Act of 1964. The significance of the Supreme Court's ruling was twofold. First, it established that gender stereotyping is actionable as sex discrimination. Second, it established the mixed-motive framework as an evidentiary framework for proving discrimination under a disparate treatment theory even when lawful reasons for the adverse employment action are also present. Hopkins's candidacy for partnership had been put on indefinite hold. She eventually resigned and sued the company for occupational sexism, arguing that her lack of promotion came after pressure to walk, talk, dress, and act more "femininely."

In 1990, a Federal district judge in Washington ordered the firm to make Hopkins a partner. It was the first time in which a court awarded partnership in a professional company as a remedy for sexual or race-based discrimination.

Following the suit, the firm received media attention due to its discriminatory labour practices towards males as well.

=== Tax issues ===
In 2014, it came to light that PwC had received $55 million from Caterpillar Inc. to develop a tax avoidance scheme. According to a US Senate investigation, PwC had helped Caterpillar Inc. drastically reduce its taxes for more than a decade.

Profits worth $8 billion were shifted from the United States to Switzerland, allegedly enabling savings of more than $2.4 billion in US taxes over that period. In Switzerland, the profits were taxed at just 4%.

A PricewaterhouseCoopers managing director involved in designing the tax savings plan wrote at the time to a PwC partner: "We'll all be retired when this ... comes up on audit."

=== American International Group Inc. ===
In 2005, BusinessWeek reported that PwC was American International Group Inc.'s auditor through AIG's years of "questionable dealings" and accounting improprieties. AIG on 30 March 2005, said that deals with a Barbados-based insurance company, for instance, may have been incorrectly accounted for over the past 14 years, because an AIG-affiliated company may have been secretly covering that insurer's losses.

BusinessWeek said that PwC also appeared to have "dropped the ball" on the deals between AIG and Berkshire Hathaway Inc.'s General Re Corp. General Re transferred $500 million in anticipated claims and premiums to AIG. BusinessWeek asked: "Did the auditor do its job by verifying that AIG was assuming risk on claims beyond the $500 million, thus allowing AIG to account for the deal as insurance? That's Accounting 101 in any reinsurance transaction."

According to a memo published by Business Insider, witnesses wondered how PwC was signing off on the accounts for both AIG and Goldman Sachs when they were using different valuation methods for the swaps contracts (and therefore booked different values for them in their accounts).

=== ChuoAoyama suspension ===
ChuoAoyama Audit Corporation (中央青山監査法人, Chūō-Aoyama Kansa Hōjin) was the Japanese affiliate of assurance service of PwC from April 2000 to 2006. In May 2006, the Financial Services Agency of Japan suspended ChuoAoyama from provision of some statutory auditing services for two months following the collapse of cosmetics company Kanebo, of which three of the partners were found assisting with accounting fraud for hiding deficits of about $1.9 billion over the course of five years.

The accountants got suspended prison terms up to 18 months from the Tokyo District Court after the judge deemed them to have played a "passive role" in the crime. The suspension was the first-ever imposed on a major accounting firm in the country. Many of the firm's largest clients were forced to find replacement auditors before the suspension began that July.

Shortly after the suspension of ChuoAoyama, PwC acted quickly to stem any possible client attrition as a result of the scandal. It set up the PricewaterhouseCoopers Aarata, and some of ChuoAoyama's accountants and most of ChuoAoyama's clients moved to the new firm. ChuoAoyama resumed operations on 1 September 2006, under the Misuzu name. However, by this point the two firms combined had 30% fewer clients than did ChuoAoyama prior to its suspension. Misuzu was dissolved in July 2007.

=== Tyco settlement ===
In July 2007, PwC agreed to pay US$229 million to settle a class-action lawsuit brought by shareholders of Tyco International Ltd. over a multibillion-dollar accounting fraud. The chief executive and chief financial officer of Tyco were found guilty of looting $600 million from the company.

=== Indian companies scandals ===
In 2007, India's accounting standards agency ICAI found partners of PwC guilty of professional negligence in under-providing for nonperforming assets of the now-defunct Global Trust Bank. This led to the RBI banning PwC from auditing any financial company for more than a year. PwC was also associated with the accounting scandal at the India-based DSQ Software, which collapsed in 2003.

In January 2009, PwC was criticised, along with the promoters of Satyam, an Indian IT firm listed on the NASDAQ, in a $1.5 billion fraud. PwC wrote a letter to the board of directors of Satyam that its audit may be rendered "inaccurate and unreliable" due to the disclosures made by Satyam's (ex) Chairman and subsequently withdrew its audit opinions.

PwC's US arm "was the reviewer for the U.S. filings for Satyam". Consequently, lawsuits were filed in the US with PwC as a defendant. Two partners of PricewaterhouseCoopers, Srinivas Talluri and Subramani Gopalakrishnan, were charged by India's Central Bureau of Investigation in connection with the Satyam scandal. After the scandal broke out, Subramani Gopalakrishnan retired from the firm after reaching mandatory retirement age, while Talluri remained on suspension from the firm.

Following the Satyam scandal, the Mumbai-based Small Investor Grievances Association (SIGA) requested the Indian stock market regulator SEBI to ban PwC permanently and seize its assets in India alleging more scandals like "Ketan Parekh stock manipulations."

In 2015, PwC India said they were disappointed with court judgement of the case saying, "As we have said many times, there has never been any evidence presented that either of our former partners S Gopalakrishnan or Srinivas Talluri were involved in or were aware of the management-led fraud at Satyam. We understand that Gopal and Talluri are considering filing an appeal against this verdict."

In 2018, PwC was banned by India's securities regulator from providing auditing services to public-listed companies for 2 years, and PwC was fined $2 million in addition to the suspension. In September 2019, this ban was overruled by the securities appellate tribunal stating that there was no evidence of collusion of PwC in the scam. The tribunal also stated that SEBI had no jurisdiction over audit firms and only ICAI could issue such an order.

==== Association with the hiring of a person accused in gold smuggling case ====
PwC, which provides consulting service to the Kerala government's Department of Information Technology and its Space Park project, has been criticised for appointing Ms. Swapna Suresh, who is accused in a case of smuggling gold in a diplomatic bag. Following an investigation, the Kerala government decided to terminate the consultancy services of PwC for the proposed Space Park project in Thiruvananthapuram. PwC sub-contracted the resource from a vendor, Vision Technologies, but the government considers that the primary liability is on PwC for recruiting Swapna Suresh.

Even before these events, the opening of the PwC office in Kerala secretariat had attracted serious criticism from the opposition party. Following this, PwC issued clarification on their hiring of Ms. Swapna Suresh by stating that she was hired based on a background verification report from past employers as well as a criminal record verification at the time. In February 2022, the state government of Kerala wrote to PwC in order to seek the refund of INR 16 Lacs paid in salary to Swapna Suresh. In April 2022, the company responded that it can't repay the amount.

=== Yukos prosecutions ===
Yukos was a Russian oil and gas company that was the target of politically motivated prosecutions by Russian authorities. The company's assets were sold for alleged unpaid taxes and it was declared bankrupt. PwC's audits were the foundation for the firm's defence in a series of continuing trials against former chief executive, Mikhail Khodorkovsky, and the former majority shareholder, Platon Lebedev. The Russian authorities then went after PwC. In March 2007, police raided PwC's Moscow offices, confiscating documents related to Yukos and charging and convicting PwC of failing to pay 243 million rubles, or $9.4 million, in taxes. PwC withdrew its Yukos audits and less than two weeks later authorities cleared PwC of any wrongdoing in regard to its audit.

In 2010, Joe Nocera in the New York Times wrote, "In 2007, with the prospect of parole on the horizon, the same prosecutors—with what appears to be the complicity of PricewaterhouseCoopers, Yukos's longtime accounting firm—indicted the two men (Mikhail B. Khodorkovsky and Platon Lebedev), again, bringing a new round of Kafkaesque charges."

In 2010, it was revealed that the Russian government placed pressure on PwC to withdraw audits.

A cable from the U.S. embassy in Moscow stated that the trial was politically motivated and that a deposition in a U.S. court by PricewaterhouseCoopers may show that PwC was pressured by the Russian government to withdraw its prior Yukos audits. An embassy source noted that "If the audits were properly withdrawn, this will be a 'black mark' for the defense; if not, it could help the defense, but would greatly tarnish PWC's international reputation."

=== Transneft Russia case ===
Upon the completion of the construction of the ESPO (East Siberia-Pacific Ocean) pipeline by Transneft in December 2010, an official report of the Audit Chamber of the Russian Federation suggested that $4 billion was stolen by Transneft insiders. One Federation Council Speaker, Sergei Mironov, called for an investigation. Alexei Navalny, a minority Transneft shareholder and lawyer, accused the company of wrongdoing in his personal blog, and criticized PwC, Transneft's auditor, of ignoring his warnings. PwC denied wrongdoing, stating that, "We believe there are absolutely no grounds for such allegations, and we stand behind our work for OAO AK Transneft."

=== Northern Rock ===
In 2007, PwC was criticised by the Treasury Select Committee of the Parliament of the United Kingdom for helping Northern Rock, a client of the firm, to sell its mortgage assets while also acting as its auditor. In 2011, a House of Lords inquiry criticized PwC for not drawing attention to the risks in the business model followed by Northern Rock, which was rescued by the UK government during the 2008 financial crisis.

=== JP Morgan Securities audit ===
In 2012, the Accountancy and Actuarial Discipline Board (AADB) of the UK fined PwC a record £1.4m for wrongly reporting to the Financial Services Authority that JP Morgan Securities had complied with client money rules which protects client funds. The accountants neglected to check whether JP Morgan had the correct systems in place and failed to gather sufficient evidence to form opinions on the issue, and as a result, failed to report that JP Morgan failed to hold client money separate from JP Morgan's money. The £1.4m fine was at the time the greatest penalty administered to a professional accountancy firm in the UK.

=== Water privatisation in Delhi ===
PwC was found to be unethically favoured by the World Bank in a bid to privatize the water distribution system of Delhi, India, an effort that was alleged as corrupt by investigators. When bidding took place, PwC repeatedly failed in each round, and the World Bank in each case pressured PwC to be pushed to the next round and eventually win the bid. The effort at privatization fell through when an investigation was conducted by Arvind Kejriwal and the non-governmental organization (NGO) Parivartan in 2005.

After submitting a Right to Information (RTI) request, Parivartan received 9000 pages of correspondence and consultation with the World Bank, where it was revealed that the privatization of Delhi's water supply would provide salaries of $25,000 a month to four administrators of each of the 21 water zones, which amounted to more than $25 million per year, increasing the budget by more than 60% and water taxes 9 times.

The Delhi Jal Board (DJB), which administers the water system of Delhi, was first approached by Parivartan in November 2004, following a report by the newspaper The Asian Age, where the scheme was revealed to the public for the first time. The DJB denied the existence of the project, but after an appeal, the RTI request was granted. The documents revealed that the project began in 1998, in complete secrecy within the DJB administration.

The DJB approached the World Bank for a loan to improve the water system, which it approved, and the effort began with a $2.5 million consultation loan. The Delhi government could have easily provided the money, and the interest rate of 12% that was to be loaned by the World Bank could have been raised on capital markets for 6%. Following the consultation, 35 multinational companies bid, of which six were to be shortlisted. When PwC was in 10th place, the World Bank said that at least one company should be from a developing country, and since PwC made the bid from its Kolkata office, it was dubbed an "Indian" company, and its rank was raised to 6th.

When PwC failed in the second round, the World Bank pressured the DJB to start over with a fresh round of bidding. Only one company succeeded in the new round that was not PwC, and the World Bank had the lowest marks from an evaluator thrown out. The contract was awarded to PwC in 2001. Following the investigation by Parivartan, a campaign was waged by Kejriwal, Aruna Roy, and other activists across Delhi and the DJB withdrew the loan application to the World Bank.

=== Cattles ===
In 2013, Cattles plc brought a legal action against PwC in the UK in respect of 2006 and 2007 audits, claiming that PwC had failed to carry out adequate investigations. Cattles, a UK consumer finance company, later discovered control weaknesses which caused its loan book to be materially overstated in its balance sheet; having been listed as a FTSE250 company, it subsequently lost its listing. PwC disputed this legal claim. The claim was settled out of court on undisclosed terms.

The Financial Reporting Council (FRC) issued a fine of £2.3m on PwC and ordered the firm to pay £750,000 costs following their investigation of the 2007 audits of Cattles and its principal trading subsidiary. PwC admitted their "conduct fell significantly short of the standards reasonably to be expected of a member firm" in respect of the 2007 financial statements. The FRC said that PwC had insufficient audit evidence as to the adequacy of loan loss provisions.

=== Quinn Insurance ===
In 2015, PwC Ireland was sued by the joint administrators of Quinn Insurance Limited (QIL) for €1bn. Having been audited by PwC for the years 2005 to 2008, QIL went into administration in 2010. The administrators alleged that PwC should have identified a material understatement of QIL's provisions for claims.

=== Connaught plc ===
Connaught plc, a UK former FTSE 250 Index outsourcing company operating in property maintenance for the social housing and public sector, was put into administration in 2010 after reporting material losses. In 2017, the Financial Reporting Council (FRC) severely reprimanded PwC and its audit partner following an investigation of their conduct in respect of the 2009 audit of Connaught. PwC was fined a record £5 million plus costs.

=== Tesco ===
In 2014, Tesco, a UK retailer, announced that it had overstated profits by £263m by misreporting discounts with suppliers. The Financial Reporting Council started an investigation into accounting practices at Tesco and into the conduct of PwC in carrying out its audits in 2012, 2013 and 2014. Two members of Tesco's Audit Committee, responsible for monitoring Tesco's relationship with its auditors, had themselves previously worked for PwC, including its chairman, Ken Hanna; he later stood down.

In 2015 PwC were replaced as auditors of Tesco, ending a 32-year engagement, following a tender process to which they did not participate. In June 2017, the Financial Reporting Council said there was no "realistic prospect" that a tribunal of the UK's accountancy watchdog would rule against the auditor PwC concerning its involvement in Tesco's 2014 case.

=== Bank of Tokyo-Mitsubishi UFJ ===
In 2014, The Bank of Tokyo-Mitsubishi UFJ was investigated by New York banking regulators over its role in routing payments for Iranian customers through its New York branch in violation of U.S. sanctions. It was found that PwC had altered an investigation report on the issue; PwC itself was fined $25 million in relation to the matter.

=== Luxembourg Leaks ===
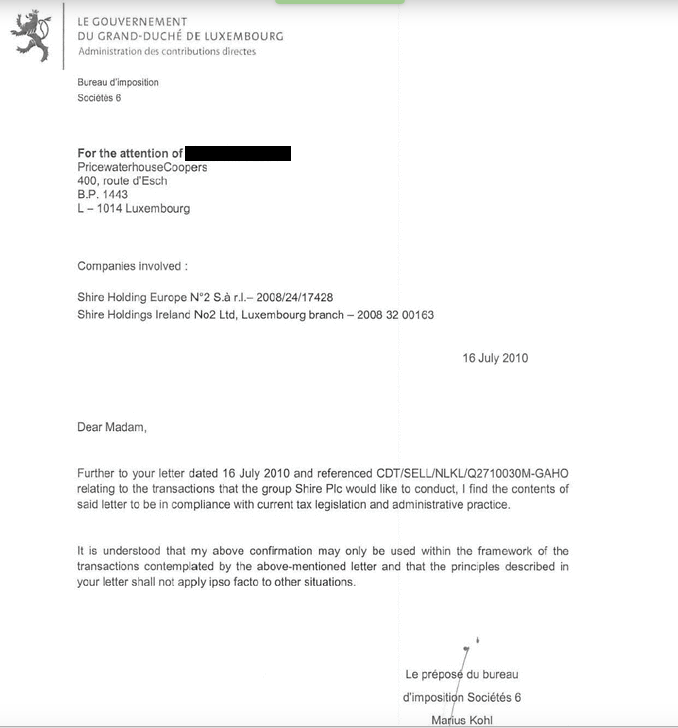
One of the tax rulings of Luxembourg Leaks negotiated by PwC

The firm helped multinational companies obtain 548 legal tax rulings in Luxembourg between 2002 and 2010. The rulings provided written assurance that the multinational companies' tax-saving plans would be seen favourably by the Luxembourg authorities. The companies saved billions of dollars in taxes with these arrangements. Some firms paid less than one percent tax on the profits they shifted to Luxembourg. Employees or former employees of PwC provided documentation of the rulings to journalists. In 2013 and 2014, PwC UK's head of tax was called before the UK's public accounts committee and was questioned about lying regarding the marketing of these tax avoidance schemes. He told the committee the financing, investments, and tax structure is legal and well known to the British government. "If you want to change the Lux tax regime, the politicians could change the Lux tax regime."

The disclosures attracted international attention and comment about tax avoidance schemes in Luxembourg and other tax havens. The revelations later led to a series of EU-wide measures aimed at regulating tax avoidance schemes and tax probes into several EU companies. In 2016, PwC initiated charges against the two whistleblowers that revealed the LuxLeaks tax controversy, and they were convicted and sentenced with suspended prison sentences and fined. In March 2017, a Luxembourg appeals court upheld the convictions of the two whistleblowers, but with reduced sentences.

=== Petrobras Brazil ===
In 2015, the Bill & Melinda Gates Foundation of Microsoft founder Bill Gates sued oil company Petrobras and accounting firm PwC's Brazil arm over investment losses due to corruption at the Brazilian oil company. The filings also alleged that PwC's Brazil affiliate, PricewaterhouseCoopers Auditores Independentes, played a significant role by attesting to Petrobras financial statements and ignoring warnings.

=== Gay marriage in Australia ===
In 2016, Luke Sayers, then CEO of PwC Australia, had the firm prepare a report projecting the excessive cost of a plebiscite on gay marriage. Mark Allaby, a senior executive at PwC, left the board of the religious lobbying organisation Australian Christian Lobby, a group campaigning against same-sex marriage, following public outrage and pressure from PwC Australia.

=== Centro Properties Group ===
In 2007, shopping centre giant Centro understated its liabilities by more than $3 billion and almost collapsed when it was unable to refinance its debt during the 2008 financial crisis. PwC was Centro's auditor and admitted negligence. In 2012, Centro and PwC paid a $200 million settlement to resolve the shareholder class action, the largest ever in Australia.

=== BHS ===
In 2016, PwC in the UK was investigated by the Financial Reporting Council over its conduct in relation to the audit of BHS for the year to 30 August 2014. PwC completed their audit of financial statements in which BHS was described as a going concern days before its sale for £1 to a consortium with no retail experience. BHS collapsed the following year with a substantial deficit in its pension fund.

=== MF Global malpractice lawsuit ===
In 2016, a United States federal judge rejected PwC's bid to dismiss a $3 billion lawsuit accusing the accounting firm of professional malpractice for helping cause the October 2011 bankruptcy of MF Global, a brokerage once run by former New Jersey Governor Jon Corzine.

=== BT Italy ===
BT Group (British Telecom), a client of PwC, reported in 2017, that profits in its Italian subsidiary had been over-stated by £530 million. BT reportedly sought the immediate replacement of PwC as auditors following a breakdown of trust, but had existing commercial relationships with the other Big 4 firms which would have prevented their early appointment. BT subsequently stated that its audit would be put out to tender to identify a replacement for PwC, In June 2017, the Financial Reporting Council began an investigation of PwC's audits of BT covering the years 2015 through 2017.

=== Oscars Best Picture announcement error ===
At the 89th Academy Awards in 2017 La La Land was incorrectly announced as the winner of Best Picture after PwC partner Brian Cullinan gave presenters Warren Beatty and Faye Dunaway the wrong envelope. PwC was responsible for tabulating the results, preparing the envelopes, and handing them to presenters.

It was called "as bad a mess-up as you could imagine." The firm took "full responsibility" for handing the presenters the wrong envelope and apologized for the error, acknowledging that Cullinan and PwC partner Martha Ruiz did not follow protocols for correcting the error quickly. In March 2017, the board of governors for the Academy voted to retain the services of accounting firm PricewaterhouseCoopers, despite the mix-up, saying "new protocols have been established including greater oversight from PwC's U.S. chairman Tim Ryan."

=== PrivatBank ===
PwC Ukraine had its audit license removed by the National Bank of Ukraine in July 2017 for its alleged "verification of misrepresented financial information" leading to a $5.5 billion balance-sheet hole in PrivatBank. The government of Ukraine had had to rescue PrivatBank by nationalisation in 2016 to protect its 20 million customers.

=== Colonial Bank audit ===
In 2017, the U.S. District Court for the Middle District of Alabama held PwC liable for professional negligence in its audit of Colonial Bank, which failed in 2009, after filing materially false financial information with the SEC. In 2018, a federal judge later ordered PwC to pay the FDIC $625 million, the largest-ever judgement against a U.S. audit firm. The FDIC reached a $335 million settlement with PwC in March 2019.

=== Age discrimination lawsuit ===
In 2018, PwC was accused of disproportionately hiring younger workers and fostering "an age-conscious workplace in which youth is highly valued." Plaintiffs estimated that younger applicants are more than 500% more likely to be hired than candidates over age 40. In March 2019, a collective action related to the case was certified by a federal judge in San Francisco.

=== Luke Sayers' AVP investment review ===
In 2018, PwC Australia CEO Luke Sayers was connected to perceived conflict of interest issues on a related to a personal investment in Australian Visa Processing (AVP), a company part-owned by PwC that was submitting a tender to redesign and run Australia's visa processing system that is potentially worth billions of dollars, which would result in a significant financial advantage for its investors.

This investment led to a "storm inside the firm", interjection by PwC Global and a review by PwC Australia of its personal investment policy for partners. The option to invest had not been offered to all partners or even the entire firm. A review was announced around the way partners make personal investments.

=== Improper audit services in US ===
During 2019, PwC's US affiliate agreed to pay more than $7.9 million to its US regulator, the Securities and Exchange Commission (SEC), to settle allegations that it improperly performed IT and other non-audit services for several audit clients.

=== Corruption in Angola ===
In 2020, the International Consortium of Investigative Journalists (ICIJ) leaked more than 700,000 internal documents revealing that PwC had facilitated multiple dealings in which Isabel dos Santos, the daughter of former President of Angola José Eduardo dos Santos, made a fortune while in charge of the state oil company, Sonangol. Dos Santos established a network of more than 400 companies to facilitate tax evasion and the steering of millions of dollars of Angolan state contracts to companies under her control.

Her husband, Congolese businessman and art collector Sindika Dokolo, made millions from a suspiciously one-sided partnership with the state diamond company, SODIAM, to buy a stake in Swiss luxury jeweller De Grisogono. After ICIJ's revelations, PwC indicated it would terminate its relationship with Dos Santos.

=== MBC Group ===
During November 2017, PwC was engaged in due diligence and valuation of the media company, MBC Group, owned by Saudi businessman, Waleed bin Ibrahim Al Ibrahim, who was allegedly held against his wishes at the Ritz-Carlton in Riyadh as part of an attempt to coerce him into selling it to the Saudi Crown Prince.

=== JD Classics ===
In July 2021, PwC was sued by administrators Alvarez and Marsal on behalf of JD Classics, a UK-based car dealership, for negligence related to audits in 2016 and 2017. A failure to identify fraud at the company led to losses of £41m. PwC responded with a statement that "this claim [lacks] merit and [we] will be vigorously defending it."

=== Lobbying revolving door ===
In 2021, an investigation by the New York Times found that PwC staff sought employment at the Treasury Department where they pursued policies that helped PwC clients. After completing their time at the Treasury Department, the staff were promoted to partner at PwC.

=== Evergrande ===
PwC has audited Evergrande, a Chinese property company, since 2009 and received fees worth $42 million for doing so. By 2021, Evergrande had collapsed financially and set off the Chinese property sector crisis, which sparked questions about PwC's role in inflating the company's revenue prior to the firm's eventual bankruptcy.

In October 2021, the accounting regulator in Hong Kong announced an investigation into PwC's audit of Evergrande. PwC had signed off the 2020 accounts of Evergrande without reference to its uncertainties as a going concern. After the announcement of the fraud investigation, PwC resigned as auditor of Evergrande's accounts. One year later, in February 2024, Evergrande's liquidators prepared for a potential lawsuit against PwC.

In September 2024, PwC ZhongTian, PwC's auditing business in China, was suspended for six months. China's securities regulator also confiscated the revenue PwC earned from auditing Evergrande and imposed a fine of $62 million. The four signing registered accountants (CPAs) on the audit reports for Evergrande Real Estate's financial statements from 2018 to 2020 were penalized with the revocation of their practicing certificates, and seven CPAs who participated in preparing Evergrande Real Estate's consolidated financial statements were given administrative penalties, such as warnings or fines.

In April 2026, PwC agreed to pay $232 million (HK$1.3 billion) in fines and compensation to settle investigations related to its auditing work for the Evergrande Group. The Accounting and Financial Reporting Council of Hong Kong issued a public reprimand to the firm and two of its former partners and registered responsible persons, and barred the firm from accepting or performing audit for new listed clients for six months.

The liquidators of Evergrande sued PwC International for $5.6 billion (€4.6 billion) of the total $8.5 billion (€7.3 billion) it wants from PwC Hong Kong, PwC ZhongTian and PwC International. A successful claim against PwC International would be covered by its in-house insurer, L&F Indemnity, which is financed by its member firms around the world. PwCI does not have any employees and operational costs are paid for and reimbursed by its member firms.

=== South African Airways ===
The Zondo Commission report on state capture in South Africa uncovered several instances of alleged corruption, fraud and mismanagement at South African Airways (SAA). The report found that PwC effectively enabled capture of SAA by failing to adequately audit its financial and accounting processes between 2012 and 2016.

=== Kier and Galliford Try ===
In June 2022, the UK's Financial Reporting Council fined PwC and a former partner, Jonathan Hook, over audit failures relating to construction firms Galliford Try and Kier Group. PwC was fined just over £3m for failing to adequately challenge revenue and costs recognised by Galliford Try's management on large, complex long-term construction contracts during 2018 and 2019 audits, and fined £1.96m for similar failures during the 2017 audit of Kier. Both fines were reduced (from £5m and £3.35m respectively) to reflect PwC's cooperation with the investigation.

=== Americanas (AMER3) controversy ===
In January 2023, the firm was involved in a controversy when it approved Americanas' (AMER3) balance sheets with accounting inconsistencies of around US$4 billion. This caused volatility to company's price on the Brazilian stock exchange and losses to the company's shareholders. After verifying the impacts caused, the CVM (Brazilian body that regulates the stock exchanges) opened investigations against the company's auditors to determine responsibilities.

=== Australia tax leak scandal ===
In 2023, it was revealed that a PwC partner, who was a member of consultation groups set up by the Australian Treasury to improve tax laws, had been leaking confidential government tax plans to PwC. The data leaked by the PwC partner included new taxation rules to close loopholes which allowed multinational companies to avoid paying tax.

After PwC completed an internal investigation in July 2023, eight partners, including former chief executive Tom Seymour, were removed from the partnership. In July 2023 PwC sold its Australian government consulting business to Allegro Funds for $1 with the business rebranded Scyne Advisory.

=== Aiding Russian oligarchs ===
PwC's Cyprus unit helped dozens of Russian oligarchs to shuffle their wealth and evade sanctions after Russia's invasion of Ukraine. PwC helped Alexey Mordashov transfer a $1.4 billion investment out of his name in order to elude EU sanctions. PwC also helped two oligarchs who were instrumental to the waging of Russia's war in Ukraine to hide $100 million.

After the start of the full-scale Russian invasion of Ukraine, on 7 March 2022, PwC stated that "under the circumstances, PwC should not have a member firm in Russia and consequently PwC Russia will leave the network." On 29 April, PwC Russia announced the withdrawal of the brand from the PwC network, and on 30 June, a legal agreement was signed on the withdrawal of the firm in Russia from the network.

A week later, on 5 July 2022, PwC Ukraine announced the final exit of the company from Russia: "PwC no longer has a firm in Russia: on 4 July 2022 all aspects of the departure of the former PwC firm in Russia have been completed".

However, in 2023, it emerged that PwC helped Russian oligarchs to avoid sanctions. PwC also stopped working in Belarus, where its staff consisted of 25 people.

=== Curaçao fraud ===
PwC helped billionaire Hushang Ansary allegedly defraud a pension fund in Curaçao by setting up shell companies to drain it. Ansary and PwC's actions threatened the income of around 30,000 pension holders.

== See also ==
- Accounting networks and associations
- Big Four accounting firms
- List of companies based in London
- Price Waterhouse v Kwan
