= Buried Bodies Case =

Mid-1970s American murder case

The Buried Bodies Case, also known as the Lake Pleasant Bodies Case, is a mid-1970s upstate New York court case where defense attorneys Frank H. Armani and Francis Belge kept secret the location of the bodies of two women murdered by their client, Robert Garrow, Sr.

Ahead of trial for an unrelated murder, Garrow confessed to his lawyers that he had murdered two missing women and hidden their bodies. Armani and Belge found the women's bodies but chose to keep the information confidential. Authorities continued to search for the missing women for months as their families grieved. When the public discovered Armani and Belge had kept this information secret, they faced criminal charges and disbarment proceedings. The attorneys claimed they were bound by the duty of confidentiality not to disclose information that could incriminate their client. Armani and Belge were later absolved of any wrongdoing.

The case has become a touchstone in legal ethics courses. It highlights lawyers' ethical obligation to keep their clients' information confidential. It also showcases the ethical questions that can arise for lawyers related to confidentiality, attorney–client privilege, and clients' self-incrimination. The case has helped shape the development of ethical rules on confidentiality.

== History ==
=== Background ===
In the summer of 1973, attorney Frank H. Armani was appointed to serve as counsel for Robert Garrow, Sr. Garrow, a 38-year old mechanic of a Syracuse bakery, was charged with murdering Philip Domblewski. Domblewski, an 18-year-old college student, was murdered while camping in the Adirondacks. He was tied to a tree and stabbed to death. Three friends were also ambushed, but escaped, leading to an eleven-day manhunt for the killer. With no experience in murder trials, Armani recruited his friend Francis Belge, an experienced criminal defense attorney, to help represent Garrow.

Ahead of trial, Garrow told his attorneys that he killed Domblewski. Garrow also claimed he murdered and hid the bodies of two missing women, Susan Petz and Alicia Hauck. He drew a diagram to show them where Petz was buried. Armani later claimed that Garrow confessed to the murders after Armani hypnotized him.

Following Garrow's confession, Armani and Belge decided to confirm whether Garrow was telling the truth. They used Garrow's diagram to uncover Petz's body in an airshaft of a coal mine in Mineville, NY. Belge later uncovered Hauck's body in a Syracuse, NY cemetery based on Garrow's description. The lawyers photographed the remains of both women. Belge moved Hauck's body to ensure a dismembered part was included in the photograph. They later destroyed the photographs, the record of their conversation with Garrow, and the diagram he drew.

Belge and Armani told no one about their discoveries. The attorneys believed they were bound by a duty of confidentiality not to disclose information that could incriminate their client. They chose not to alert authorities despite pleas from Hauck's father for information. Hauck and Armani's daughter went to the same school. Family members and authorities continued to search for the women. The bodies were discovered accidentally five months after Garrow confessed in private to his attorneys.

=== Trial ===
Armani and Belge proposed a plea bargain using the information they had uncovered ahead of trial. They told the prosecutor that they might be able to provide information to help authorities find the missing women if Garrow were sentenced to life in a mental hospital rather than prison. The prosecutor refused.

In the summer of 1974, Garrow's trial for the murder of Domblewski began. Armani and Belge pursued an insanity defense. While testifying in his own defense, Garrow admitted to murdering four people including Petz and Hauck. During direct examination of Garrow, Belge asked, "Is that the one I found?" implying that he was aware of the dead women prior to trial. The attorneys held a press conference the next day, where they admitted they had known about the location of the missing women for six months.

Garrow was convicted for Domblewski's murder. He was sentenced to 25 years to life in prison.

=== Public scrutiny ===
Armani and Belge were harassed and threatened by the public for keeping information about the deceased women secret. They received death threats and angry letters. News outlets claimed they obstructed justice or acted as accomplices after the fact. The public also criticized lawyers generally for their callousness and lack of concern for the public interest. Armani and Belge faced criminal and ethical proceedings.

==== People v. Belge ====
A grand jury investigated the attorneys' conduct. Belge was indicted for allegedly violating two state public health laws by failing to disclose his discovery of the dead bodies.

In People v. Belge, Belge claimed conversations about the missing women were confidential and protected by the attorney–client privilege, which prevents lawyers from disclosing protected communications about their clients. He claimed he could not have shared the information with authorities. The National Association of Criminal Defense lawyers wrote a brief supporting Belge, arguing that attorney–client privilege would be destroyed if Belge were convicted.

The New York county court dismissed the indictment "in the interests of justice." The court found that Belge had protected the Fifth Amendment constitutional right of his client not to incriminate himself. It also found that Garrow's disclosure of information about the missing women was protected by confidentiality and the attorney–client privilege. In its decision, the court explained:

The effectiveness of counsel is only as great as the confidentiality of its client-attorney relationship. If the lawyer cannot get all the facts about the case, he can only give his client half of a defense. This, of necessity, involves telling his attorney everything remotely connected with the crime.

The prosecution appealed. The appeals court confirmed that the claims should be dismissed, but expressed concern about a limitless attorney–client privilege. It noted that attorneys must protect their clients, but must also "observe basic human standards of decency."

==== Ethics complaints ====
One of the victims' parents filed ethics complaints against Armani and Belge with New York State Bar Association disciplinary officials.

The New York State Bar Association Committee on Professional Ethics found that the attorneys acted ethically by refusing to disclose information about the missing women. The committee explained that the attorneys would have violated their ethical obligations to keep their client's confidential information secret if they had disclosed the details to authorities.

The ethics opinion emphasized that the attorney–client privilege is necessary to ensure clients disclose all possible pertinent information to their lawyers. It further explained that disclosure of all possibly pertinent information allows attorneys to craft the strongest defense and protect their clients' rights to the fullest extent.

=== Aftermath ===
Although both lawyers were ultimately absolved of wrongdoing, the fallout took a toll on Armani and Belge. Belge abandoned his law practice and moved to Florida. Armani suffered a heart attack. His law practice was initially destroyed, although he later rebuilt it.

Four years after his conviction, Garrow escaped from prison. When authorities searched his cell, they found a hit list including Armani and Belge's names. Armani gave police advice about where Garrow might have gone. This information led police to discover Garrow hiding near the prison. He was shot and killed.

== Ethical issues ==
The central question Armani and Belge faced was whether to disclose the location of the missing women's bodies. Disclosure of their discoveries could have implicated their client in the women's murders.

The case also raises broader ethical questions about the role of the lawyer, and their obligations to their clients and society as a whole. The case showcases the tension between protecting a client's interest and the potential emotional harm that victims, their family, or a community might experience. It also shows the potential tension between a lawyer's professional obligations and their personal interests or values.

Some scholars have suggested the case presents further ethical questions if altered facts are considered. For example, scholars have asked whether Armani and Belge would have been required to assist the women or disclose their locations had they been found alive.

== Legal doctrines ==
A few contemporary legal and ethical doctrines are relevant in cases like the Buried Bodies Case today.

=== Confidentiality ===
Lawyers have an ethical obligation to keep their clients' information secret. This duty of confidentiality extends beyond information the client tells the lawyer directly. Any information a lawyer learns "relating to the representation of the client" must be kept confidential, including information learned from interviews, photographs, or observations. A lawyer can disclose information if a client consents. If a lawyer violates their client's confidentiality, the lawyer may be subject to disciplinary proceedings.

Some states have adopted exceptions to this rule. One exception adopted by some states is that a lawyer may reveal client information if they believe the disclosure is necessary to prevent reasonably certain death or substantial bodily harm.

=== Attorney–client privilege ===
Lawyers cannot be compelled to disclose certain lawyer-client communications due to the attorney–client privilege. "Privileged" information includes communications where a client seeks legal advice or services. Attorney–client privilege is not an ethical obligation, but rather a procedural rule. A court can quash a request for a lawyer to disclose information that violates the privilege.

=== Fifth Amendment ===
The Fifth Amendment of the U.S. Constitution protects defendants against self-incrimination.

== Impact ==
The Buried Bodies Case attracted significant attention in the mid-1970s in the throes of the Watergate scandal. Several legal scholars believe Armani and Belge acted ethically in refraining from sharing their client's confession. During Watergate, the American Bar Association (ABA) began reconsidering attorneys' ethical obligations. Meanwhile, law schools too began reconsidering the form of legal ethics in their curriculum.

=== Confidentiality rules ===
While ethical rules are determined by each state, portions of the ABA's Model Rules of Professional Conduct have been adopted by 49 states. All states have some ethical duty of confidentiality in their code of professional responsibility.

The Buried Bodies Case helped shape the development of one of the main exceptions to the ABA's rule on confidentiality (Model Rule 1.6). Model Rule 1.6 provides that a lawyer will not reveal information relevant to her representation of a client without the client's consent. The case contributed to an exception that allows lawyers to disclose information if a person could be imminently harmed. The exception states that a lawyer may reveal information relating to their client if they reasonably believe it is necessary "to prevent reasonably certain death or substantial bodily harm."

This exception, added by amendment in 2002, was hotly contested; lawyers worried the language might erode the duty of confidentiality.

=== Legal ethics education ===
The case has become a touchstone of legal ethics courses. The case is widely taught in law schools to examine concerns that arise out of the duty of confidentiality. It is a fixture in professional responsibility textbooks.

It may have also encouraged legal ethics professors to incorporate problems or case studies into their teaching. The Buried Bodies Case provided professors with an example in the mid-1970s of how ethical issues could be taught from a human perspective with real world problems.

The case has also been used by business schools to explore the challenges that can arise from role-based obligations.

== Criticism ==
The mother of Susan Petz, one of the girls murdered by Garrow, remains unsatisfied by the case. In a 2016 interview with Radiolab, she criticized law schools for teaching the case. She suggested lawyers should consider the victims' families when deciding whether to keep information about missing victims confidential.

Some legal scholars have also criticized the case. Some argue the attorneys' refusal to disclose the confidential information did not lead to a better outcome for the client. Others say the attorneys' refusal to share information with the women's families was appalling; they claim attorneys should disclose information that might provide closure for victims in a way that would not impact their client. Similarly, some have considered a new exception to confidentiality rules to allow disclosure when victims suffer severe emotional harm. Moreover, others criticize the case for exempting lawyers from laws, like the public health code requiring the disclosure of dead bodies, that apply to everyone else.

== In popular culture ==
The case has been the subject of numerous books, including Privileged Information by Tom Alibrandi with Frank Armani (1984) and Terror in the Adirondacks: The True Story of Serial Killer Robert F. Garrow by Lawrence Gooley (2009).

It was featured in “The Buried Bodies Case” in 2016 on the podcast RadioLab.

It has also been dramatized in the 1987 TV film Sworn to Silence, and a 2003 episode of the TV series Law & Order, "Bodies.” In 2017, Fargo producer Noah Hawley announced the development of a feature film based on the case.

== See also ==
- Confidentiality
- Duty of confidentiality
- Fifth Amendment (U.S. Constitution)
- Legal ethics
- Physician–patient privilege
- Priest–penitent privilege
- Reporter's privilege
- Sixth Amendment (U.S. Constitution)
- Spousal privilege
- State secrets privilege
