= Ontario (Public Safety and Security) v. Criminal Lawyers' Association =

Ontario (Public Safety and Security) v Criminal Lawyers' Association
- Supreme Court of Canada

Hearing: 2008: December 11 Judgment: 2010: June 17
- Citations: 2010 SCC 23, [2010] 1 S.C.R. 815
- Docket No.: 32172

Court membership
- Chief Justice: Beverley McLachlin; Puisne Justices: Ian Binnie, Louis LeBel, Marie Deschamps, Morris Fish, Rosalie Abella, Louise Charron, Marshall Rothstein, Thomas Cromwell

Reasons given
- Unanimous reasons by: The Court

In Ontario (Public Safety and Security) v Criminal Lawyers' Association the Criminal Lawyers' Association (CLA) of Canada took action against the Ontario Ministry of Public Safety and Security to challenge section 23 of the Ontario Freedom of Information and Protection of Privacy Act; they desired access to state records of alleged misconduct by state officials in a murder trial because they were concerned about the disparity between the findings at trial and the conclusion of the police investigation. The documents in question were three in number, of which two consisted of privileged legal advice to the Ontario Provincial Police.

The CLA claimed that their right in Section 2 of the Canadian Charter of Rights and Freedoms overrode section 23. The 76-paragraph judgment by McLachlin CJ and Abella J, with unanimous concurrence, confirmed the constitutionality of section 23, i.e., ruled that solicitor-client privilege override the public interest.

Although the case dealt with civil rights, which lie under provincial jurisdiction, the case was joined by a plethora of attorneys-general who acted as intervenors, most of whom had in their own legislation near-verbatim copies of section 23.

== See also ==
- Solosky v R
- Descôteaux v Mierzwinski
