= Civil discovery under United States federal law =

Civil discovery under United States federal law is wide-ranging and can involve any material which is relevant to the case except information which is privileged, information which is the work product of the opposing party, or certain kinds of expert opinions. (Criminal discovery rules may differ from those discussed here.) Electronic discovery or "e-discovery" is used when the material is stored on electronic media.

In practice, most civil cases in the United States are settled or resolved after discovery without actual trial. After discovery, both sides often are in agreement about the relative strength and weaknesses of each side's case and this often results in a settlement which eliminates the expense and risks of a trial. Another common way of the resolution without trial is a motion for summary judgment or a motion to dismiss.

== History ==
Section 15 of the Judiciary Act of 1789 provided:

[A]ll the said courts of the United States, shall have power in the trial of actions at law, on motion and due notice thereof being given, to require the parties to produce books or writings in their possession or power, which contain evidence pertinent to the issue, in cases and under circumstances where they might be compelled to produce the same by the ordinary rules of proceeding in chancery; and if a plaintiff shall fail to comply with such order, to produce books or writings, it shall be lawful for the courts respectively, on motion, to give the like judgment for the defendant as in cases of nonsuit; and if a defendant shall fail to comply with such order, to produce books or writings, it shall be lawful for the courts respectively on motion as aforesaid, to give judgment against him or her by default.

In 2007 Bell Atlantic Corp. v. Twombly, 550 U.S. 544 and, in 2009, Ashcroft v. Iqbal, 556 U.S. 662, referred to colloquially as "Twiqbal," were decided. Those two decisions, citing "judicial experience and common sense" as a standard, permit dismissal of cases filed in federal court without requiring discovery of a defendant unless significant concrete facts are alleged in a complaint. In 2015 the Federal Rules of Civil Procedure were amended to limit discovery to materials that are “proportional to the needs of the case.”

== Current law at the federal level ==
Discovery in the United States is unique compared to other common law countries. In the United States, discovery is mostly performed by the litigating parties themselves, with relatively minimal judicial oversight. The Federal Rules of Civil Procedure guide discovery in the U.S. federal court system. Most state courts follow a similar version based upon the FRCP, Chapter V "Depositions & Discovery" .

FRCP Rule 26 provides general guidelines to the discovery process, it requires Plaintiff to initiate a conference between the parties to plan the discovery process after the initial complaint had been filed. The parties must confer as soon as practicable — and in any event at least 21 days before a scheduling conference is to be held or a scheduling order is due under Rule 16(b). The parties should attempt to agree on the proposed discovery plan, and submit it to the court within 14 days after the conference. The Discovery Plan must state the parties' proposals on subject of the discovery, limitations on discovery, case management schedule and timing deadlines for each stage of the discovery process, including the end-date of the discovery, dispositive motions and pre-trial order deadlines. Unless all parties agree otherwise, the parties should submit to each other the Initial Disclosures under Rule 26(a) within 14 days after the conference. Only after the Initial Disclosures have been sent, the main discovery process begins, that includes: depositions, interrogatories, request for admissions and request for production of documents. There are limitation on interrogatories to twenty-five requests per party each, but there is no limitations on RFAs and RFPs, unless there is a different Local Rule for the State. Depositions are limited to ten per party, with no deposition lasting longer than seven hours per day. A party may request more depositions from the court. See FRCP 30.

=== Rule 26. General Provisions Governing Discovery; Duty of Disclosure ===
Rule 26 is the most substantial rule; it guides the discovery process.

Subdivision (a) provides for automatic disclosure, which first was added in 1993. Disclosure requires parties to share their own supporting evidence without being requested to by the other party. Failure to do so can preclude that evidence from being used at trial. This applies only to evidence that supports their own case, not anything that would harm their case. For example, a plaintiff brings a case alleging a negligent accident where the defendant damaged the plaintiff's boat. The plaintiff would then be required to automatically disclose repair bills for his damaged property (Since this would only support his case) (26(a)(1)(c)).

Subdivision (b) is the heart of the discovery rule, and defines what is discoverable and what is limited. Anything that is relevant is available for the other party to request, as long as it is not privileged or otherwise protected. Under §1, relevance is defined as anything more or less likely to prove a fact that affects the outcome of the claim. It does not have to be admissible in court as long as it could reasonably lead to admissible evidence.

However, there are limits to discovery. §2 allows the court to alter the limits of discovery on the number of depositions, interrogatories, and document requests if it determines that the discovery sought is overly burdensome, redundant, unnecessary, or disproportionately difficult to produce with respect to the importance of the case or specific issue. Enshrined in §3, the work-product doctrine protects tangible (and some intangible) items created in anticipation of the litigation (e.g., a memorandum from an attorney outlining his strategy in the case). Protecting work product is considered in the interest of justice because discovery of such work product would expose an attorney's complete legal strategy before trial. §4 allows discovery of experts whose opinions may be presented at trial, but limits discovery of experts not likely to testify during trial. §5 generally prohibits the discovery of any material legally privileged (attorney–client, doctor–patient, etc.), and requires the production of a "privilege log" which describes the privileged information or material in a way that allows others to see that (if) it is privileged, but does not divulge the privileged material.

Subdivision (c) provides for protective orders.

Subdivision (d) specifies the times at which parties may employ the various methods of discovery.

Subdivision (e) provides for supplementation, which requires a person to correct any submitted information as it is necessary. For example, if medical records are submitted, and then the submitter's doctor calls to say a crucial medical test just came in, the submitter may be required to send that new report to the other party without being requested to do so.

Subdivision (f) provides a special meeting between the parties to organize their discovery process; this is a required step.

Subdivision (g) is the good faith rule which provides sanctions to any party that makes a discovery request or response designed to thwart justice, cause undue delay, or harass the other party.

=== Rule 27. Depositions Before Action or Pending Appeal ===
Guides depositions taken before the suit begins or after the trial ends.

=== Rule 28. Persons Before Whom Depositions May Be Taken ===
Further regulates basic requirements of a deposition. For example, this rule sets forth some of the requirements for oaths in depositions. Depositions are a relatively expensive method of discovery in part because of these official requirements.

=== Rule 29. Stipulations Regarding Discovery Procedure ===
Miscellaneous information.

=== Rule 30. Deposition Upon Oral Examination ===
Main deposition rule in regard to actual procedure. Limits depositions to only one day of questioning, for seven hours during that one day. Any more must be approved by court order or stipulation of the parties involved. Rule also provides for times when an attorney may intervene and direct his client not to answer the question. An attorney is restricted in objecting to only three factors: 1) To preserve a privilege, 2) preserve a court order, or 3) to prevent any harassing questions.

=== Rule 31. Depositions Upon Written Questions ===
A rarely used, borderline obsolete method of deposition by sending a court reporter with a written list of questions to a witness. The reporter, not an attorney, questions the witness. This rule is really a combination of a deposition with an interrogatory. Used in rare situations such as deposing someone in difficult to find places such as remote locations or prisons.

=== Rule 32. Use of Depositions in Court Proceedings ===
How the deposition can be used in court. Usually testimony in court is preferred, but if a witness dies or flees the country before trial, a deposition may be read into the record.

=== Rule 33. Interrogatories to Parties ===
Governs Interrogatories, which are written questions to an opposing party. Limited to twenty-five questions without special court order. May be completed by counsel, not the party himself; because of that, of limited use in most cases. (interrogatories are for use on PARTIES only)

=== Rule 34. Production of Documents and Things and Entry Upon Land for Inspection and Other Purposes ===
In some cases, a party may simply allow free access to enter its property and inspect its documents as it sees fit. For example, plaintiff requests some files which are part of a massive collection the defendant did not organize well. Defendant simply lets the plaintiff rummage through, placing the burden on the other party. In practice this rule is rarely used as it requires a party to give up control of their information and is therefore too risky for most lawyers. However it is a method of avoiding time and cost in responding to broad discovery requests. May also be used for land inspection in certain cases, e.g. so a plaintiff may enter the defendant's land to inspect a defective feature.

=== Rule 35. Physical and Mental Examination of Persons ===
Regulates physicals and psychological evaluations of parties (e.g., suing for health damages for asbestos, the defendant may require a plaintiff to see their own doctor (usually only after a court order)).

=== Rule 36. Requests for Admissions ===
Allows parties to simply ask the opposing party to admit or deny a certain part of their claim. Helps narrow issues for trial and discovery.

=== Rule 37. Failure to Make or Cooperate in Discovery; Sanctions ===
In case a party does not respond to a discovery request, this rule allows sanctions to be placed upon them. In objecting to a discovery request as proclaimed (see rule 26(b)(2)) a party must write back to the other party their reasons for not answering. Both parties are then required to confer in good faith to reach an agreement. Failure to do so can result in fines for the offending party. Failing an agreement, the original party requesting the information must then petition the court for an order to force the other party to answer. Should the other party still refuse to answer, it may be fined, have its evidence prevented from being admitted, or have its claim dismissed partially or entirely.

== At the state level ==
Many states have adopted discovery procedures based on the federal system; some closely adhere to the federal model, others not so closely. Some states take an entirely different approach to discovery.
