= Priest–penitent privilege =

Rule of evidence

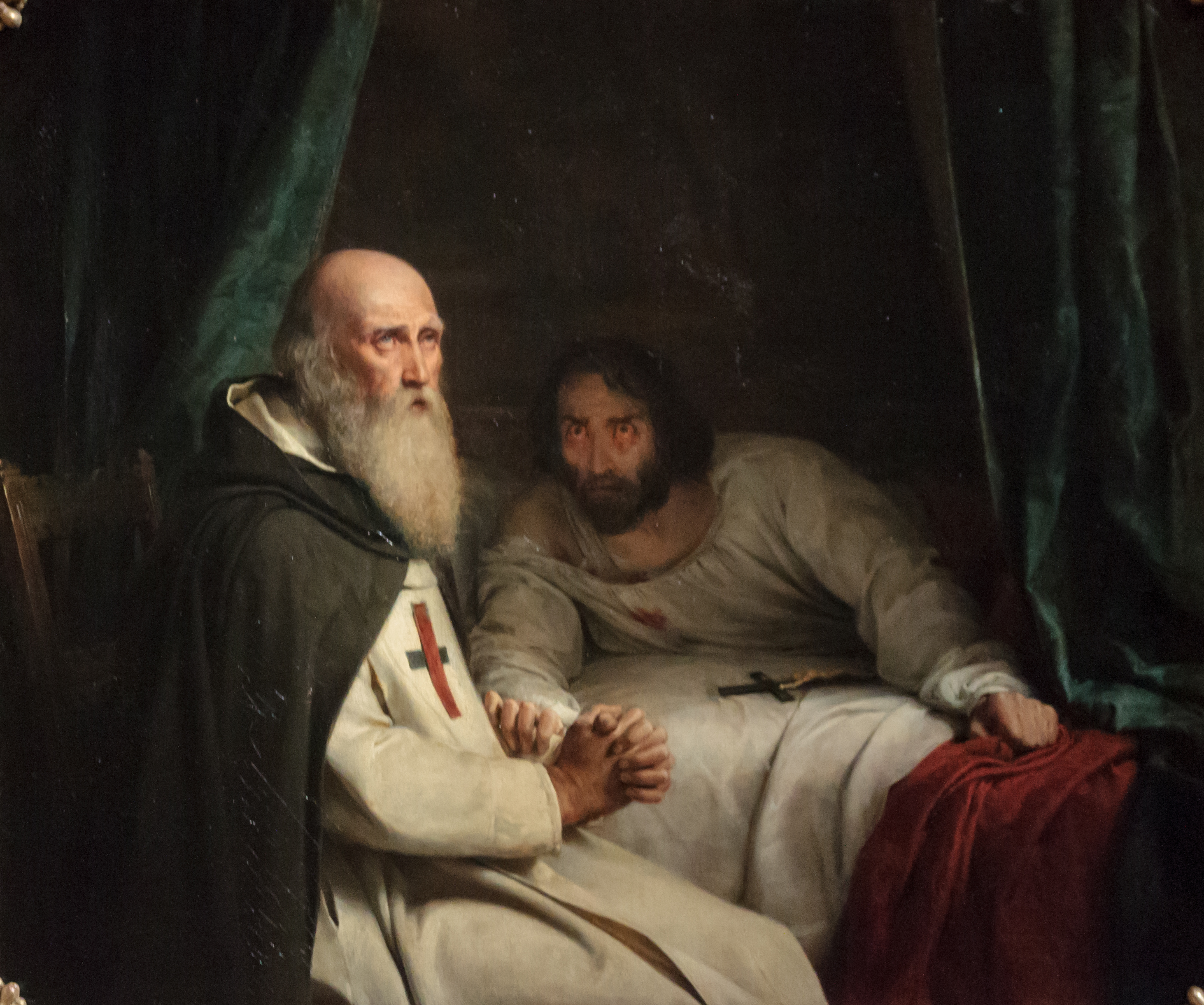
The Confession (Marie Amélie Cogniet, 1842)

The priest–penitent privilege, clergy–penitent privilege, clergy privilege, confessional privilege, pastor–penitent privilege, clergyman–communicant privilege, or ecclesiastical privilege, is a rule of evidence that forbids judicial inquiry into certain communications (spoken or otherwise) between clergy and members of their congregation. This rule recognises certain communication as privileged and not subject to otherwise obligatory disclosure, similar to attorney–client privilege between lawyers and clients. In many jurisdictions certain communications between a member of the clergy of some or all religious faiths (e.g., a minister, priest, rabbi, imam) and a person consulting them in confidence are privileged in law. In particular, Catholics, Lutherans and Anglicans, among adherents of other Christian denominations, confess their sins to priests, who are unconditionally forbidden by Church canon law from making any disclosure, a position supported by the law of many countries, although in conflict with civil (secular) law in some jurisdictions. It is a distinct concept from that of confidentiality (see non-disclosure agreement).

The protection of the clergy–penitent privilege relationships rests on one of the more basic privileges as strong or stronger than the similar clauses to confidentiality between lawyer and client.

== Australia ==
In Australia, most states now implement various versions of the Commonwealth Uniform Evidence Law 1995, which provides for clergy privilege. States which have not implemented a version of the Uniform Evidence Act are covered by common law derived from the English common law. Since there is very little case law regarding priest-penitent privilege, it is not absolutely clear if such privilege applies: the standard understanding is that there is no such privilege, but there is some disagreement.

Several states have modified the effect of the statutory Evidence Law to restrict clergy privilege when applied to child abuse cases.

In the state of Queensland, a law was passed on August 9, 2020, that forces members of the clergy to report known or suspected cases of abuse to the police, meaning they are no longer allowed to use the sanctity of the confessional as a defence or excuse in child sex abuse matters.

== Canada ==
Two Canadian provinces recognize the privilege in the communications between individuals and their religious leaders in their statutes (Newfoundland and Labrador under its Evidence Act and Quebec under its Charter of Human Rights and Freedoms). Otherwise, religious communication is covered by common law.

Canadian law descends from British common law, and as such the status of priest–penitent privilege is not well defined in national jurisprudence. R. v. Gruenke from 1991 is the leading Supreme Court of Canada case regarding this privilege. Religious communications are not presumptively (prima facie) privileged.

The court establishes that a test, proposed by John Henry Wigmore, might be employed to determine whether a specific communication is privileged or not. The "Wigmore Criteria" are seen as a general framework, not a "carved in stone" approach. The "Wigmore Criteria" are generally used to determine if privilege covers communications that do not fall under the classic privileged communications such as solicitor–client privilege or spousal privilege.

To determine whether a communication is privileged, the "Wigmore Criteria" state that:

1. The communications must originate in a confidence that they will not be disclosed.
2. This element of confidentiality must be essential to the full and satisfactory maintenance of the relation between the parties.
3. The relation must be one which in the opinion of the community ought to be sedulously fostered.
4. The injury that would inure to the relation by the disclosure of the communication must be greater than the benefit thereby gained for the correct disposal of litigation.

The "Wigmore Criteria" are informed by the Canadian Charter of Rights and Freedoms guarantee of freedom of religion (protected under s.2(a)) and the interpretive s.27 ("This Charter shall be interpreted in a manner consistent with the preservation and enhancement of the multicultural heritage of Canadians").

As a result of s.27, the term religious communications is used in place of the more common term priest–penitent. Similarly, analysis should begin from a non-denominational approach.

Religious freedom strengthens the argument in favour of recognition of the privilege for religious communications. However, religious communications are only privileged in particular cases when the Wigmore criteria are satisfied. While a formal confession process is not necessary, it can help in determining whether there is an expectation of privacy when evaluating the communication using the "Wigmore Criteria."

In R. v. Gruenke, it was found that the communications were not privileged because there was no expectation of privilege between Ms. Gruenke and her pastor and her religious counsellor.

In October 1999, it was reported that the Canadian government had opposed a plan to recognize the value of priest–penitient privilege within the bounds of international law.

== England and Wales ==
The status of priest–penitent privilege in English law has not been absolutely determined.

== France ==
In October 2021, a report which investigated sexual abuse of children by Catholic clergy and lay persons employed by the church, recommended to require priests to notify the police about child abuse cases that are mentioned in confession. Bishop Eric de Moulins-Beaufort rejected the recommendation. Interior minister Darmanin told him in a meeting that priests are obliged to report cases of sexual violence against children, even when heard in the confessional, to the police. The spokeswoman for the French bishops' conference later said that they are not required to do that.

== Germany ==
Accused clerics not infrequently see confession as an opportunity to reveal their own abuse crimes. The protected sphere of the confessional box was even used by accused clerics to prepare or conceal offences in some cases. The Sacrament of Confession is therefore particularly significant in this context. The responsibility of the confessor for the adequate clarification, processing and prevention of individual sexual abuse offences needs to be emphasised from a scientific point of view.

— Research Project (MHG Study), "Sexual abuse of minors by catholic priests, deacons and male members of orders in the domain of the German Bishops' Conference", English Summary, p. 14

In Germany, under section 383(1) No 4 Code of Civil Procedure, clerics may refuse to testify, with a view to what was entrusted to them in the exercise of their pastoral care and guidance. The same applies to document production under section 142(2) Code of Civil Procedure. One must bear in mind that, from the outset, only specific documents whose existence is known of by the petitioner can be asked for, section 142(1) Code of Civil Procedure.

The MHG study found that the priest-penitent privilege in Germany had been used to cover up sexual abuse.

== Ireland ==
The privilege was recognised under the common law of the Republic of Ireland as the privilege of the priest in the case of Cook v. Carroll [1945] IR 515., reversing an earlier judgment from 1802. In 2011, in the wake of several sex abuse scandals, the Fine Gael–Labour government announced plans to criminalise failure to report an allegation of child abuse, even if made during confession. Seán Brady, the Catholic primate of all Ireland, condemned this as compromising the seal of the confessional.

== Poland ==
Article 178 of the Polish Code of Criminal Procedure explicitly forbids calling a clergyman as a witness in order to disclose information he obtained during a confession. Article 261 of the Polish Code of Civil Procedure allows clergymen to abstain from testifying if this would reveal information he obtained during a confession.

== Taiwan ==
Article 182 of Criminal Procedure states that a witness who is or was clergyman, lawyer, physician, psychologist or other similar roles cannot be compelled into testifying against their clients (not limited to defendants) regarding secrets learned during their service unless with explicit permission from said person.

== United States ==
According to former Chief Justice of the United States Warren Burger, "The clergy privilege is rooted in the imperative need for confidence and trust. The [...] privilege recognizes the human need to disclose to a spiritual counselor, in total and absolute confidence, what are believed to be flawed acts or thoughts and to receive consolations and guidance in return."

Roman Catholic priests have a duty under canon law to hold in confidence any information obtained during confession. Other religious groups often have similar requirements. A pastor of any denomination who discloses confessional information might be at risk in a civil lawsuit for an invasion of privacy or defamation. However, many jurisdictions have recognized the need for exceptions in extreme cases, such as child abuse, child neglect, sexual abuse, "notorious crimes"/murder, as the needs of modern civil society to protect victims prevail over the 'laws' of a particular religion, which irrespective of the First Amendment's Free Exercise Clause, does not override modern legal jurisprudence.

The First Amendment is largely cited as the jurisprudential basis. The earliest and most influential case acknowledging the priest–penitent privilege was People v. Phillips (1813), where the Court of General Sessions of the City of New York refused to compel a priest to testify. The Court opined:

It is essential to the free exercise of a religion, that its ordinances should be administered—that its ceremonies as well as its essentials should be protected. Secrecy is of the essence of penance. The sinner will not confess, nor will the priest receive his confession, if the veil of secrecy is removed: To decide that the minister shall promulgate what he receives in confession, is to declare that there shall be no penance...

A few years after Phillips was decided, People v. Smith distinguished the case on the grounds that the defendant had approached the minister as a "friend or adviser", not in his capacity as a professional or spiritual advisor. As with most privileges, a debate still exists about the circumstances under which the priest–penitent privilege applies. The capacity in which the clergyman is acting at the time of the communication is relevant in many jurisdictions.

=== Clergy–penitent privilege and mandated reporting ===
In U.S. practice, the confidentiality privilege has been extended to non-Catholic clergy and non-sacramental counseling, with explicit clergy exemptions put into most state law over the past several decades. In most states, information gained within a confession or private conversation is considered privileged and may be exempted from mandatory reporting requirements.

=== Federal rule ===
Proposed, but rejected, Rule 506 (Communications to Clergy) of the Federal Rules of Evidence provides:

- (a) Definitions. As used in this rule:
  - (1) A "clergyman" is a minister, priest, rabbi, or other similar functionary of a religious organization, or an individual reasonably believed so to be by the person consulting him.
  - (2) A communication is "confidential" if made privately and not intended for further disclosure except to other persons present in furtherance of the purpose of the communication.
- (b) General rule of privilege. A person has a privilege to refuse to disclose and to prevent another from disclosing a confidential communication made by the person to a clergyman in his professional character as a spiritual adviser.
- (c) Who may claim the privilege. The privilege may be claimed by the person, by his guardian or conservator, or by his personal representative if he is deceased. The clergyman may claim the privilege on behalf of the person. His authority so to do is presumed in the absence of evidence to the contrary.

=== Legal precedents in various states ===
According to New York state law, confessions and confidences made to a clergyman or other minister are privileged and cannot be used as evidence. This privilege is not limited to communications with a particular kind of priest or congregant, and it is not confined to statements made "under the cloak of confession". What matters is that the conversations were of a spiritual nature, and were confidential enough to indicate that the penitent intended that they be kept secret and that the penitent did not waive the privilege subsequently.

New York law (NY CPLR 4505) provides that unless the person confessing or confiding waives the privilege, a clergyman, or other ministers of any religion or duly accredited Christian Science practitioner, shall not be allowed to disclose a confession or confidence made to him in his professional character as a spiritual advisor.

A 1999 Oregon bill gives clergy members the same type of immunity long granted to spouses, whose conversations are privileged.

Oregon Statute ORS 40.260 (Clergy–Penitent Privilege) states confidential communication made privately and not intended for further disclosure may not be examined unless consent to the disclosure of the confidential communication is given by the person who made the communication. Oregon's reporting law 419B.010(1), explicitly exempts pastors from any duty to report such privileged communications.

In California, absent waivers, Cal. Evid. Code § 912, both clergy and penitent – whether or not parties to the action – have the privilege to refuse to disclose a "penitential" communication. Cal. Evid. Code §§ 1033–34.

In 25 states, the clergyman–communicant statutory privilege does not clearly indicate who holds the privilege. In 17 states, the penitent's right to hold the privilege is clearly stated. In only 6 states, both a penitent and a member of the clergy are expressly allowed by the statute to hold the privilege.

In Florida, pastors have an absolute right to keep counseling details confidential.

The Official Code of Georgia Annotated states: "Every communication made by any person professing religious faith, seeking spiritual comfort, or seeking counseling to any Protestant minister of the Gospel, any priest of the Roman Catholic faith, any priest of the Greek Orthodox Catholic faith, any Jewish rabbi, or any Christian or Jewish minister or similar functionary, by whatever name called, shall be deemed privileged. No such minister, priest, rabbi, or similar functionary shall disclose any communications made to him or her by any such person professing religious faith, seeking spiritual guidance, or seeking counseling, nor shall such minister, priest, rabbi, or similar functionary be competent or compellable to testify with reference to any such communication in any court" (O.C.G.A 24-5-502).

Louisiana's Supreme Court ruled in 2014 that a priest may be compelled to testify about what he was told in the confessional regarding a particular sexual abuse case, leaving the priest at risk of excommunication if he even confirms that a confession took place, or jail for contempt of court should he refuse to testify. However, the Court later ruled that a priest has no duty to report confidential information heard during a sacramental confession.

== Justification of the principle ==
McNicol gives three arguments in favour of the privilege:

- Freedom of religion.
- The ethical duty of ministers of religion to keep confessions confidential.
- The practical fact that ministers of religion will inevitably be ruled by their consciences and defy the courts, even at the cost of their own liberty.

Jeremy Bentham, writing in the early years of the 19th century, devoted a whole chapter to serious, considered argument that Catholic confession should be exempted from disclosure in judicial proceedings, even in Protestant countries, entitled: Exclusion of the Evidence of a Catholic Priest, respecting the confessions entrusted to him, proper.

== See also ==
- Privilege (evidence)
- Duty of confidentiality
- Admissible evidence

== Bibliography ==
- Doyle, D. J. (1984). "Religious freedom and Canadian church privileges". Journal of Church and State. 26 (2): 293–311. doi:10.1093/jcs/26.2.293.
- McNicol, S. B. (1992). Law of Privilege. Sydney: Law Book Co. Ltd. ISBN 0-455-21149-3., Ch.5
