= Litigation privilege =

Litigation privilege can refer to:

- Work product doctrine, which confers privileged status on certain works made in relation to litigation
- An absolute privilege defence against defamation for certain statements made in the course of litigation or other similar proceedings
