= Adverse authority =

Adverse authority or adverse controlling authority, in United States law, is some controlling authority based on a legal decision and opposed to the position of an attorney in a case before the court. The attorney is under an ethical obligation to disclose that legal decision, which is an adverse authority, to the court. This obligation is set forth in the American Bar Association Model Rules of Professional Conduct, §3.3.

== Basis for the disclosure requirement ==
The obligation to disclose adverse authority is in tension with the attorney's obligation to zealously represent the interests of the client. However, various public policy arguments have been set forth to explain why the attorney's duty of candor to the court with respect to such authority outweighs the duty to the client's cause. Ostensibly, the reason is to serve the law itself by preventing a court from making a decision that is erroneous in light of the authority revealed.

As a practical matter, an attorney who discovers adverse authority and fails to disclose it to the court may lose credibility with the court if the authority is found by opposing counsel, or by the court itself. The court may presume that an attorney who fails to disclose such authority has either been unethical in failing to disclose it, or has acted without diligence in failing to discover it. Moreover, the attorney disclosing such authority has the opportunity to frame the disclosure in a manner that seeks to diminish the impact of that authority by presenting arguments as to why it is inapplicable to the facts of the current case, or should be overturned altogether.

== What must be disclosed ==
In order to fall within the obligation for disclosure, the matter must meet three conditions: it must be legal authority, it must be directly adverse, and it must be from a controlling jurisdiction.

Legal authority

The matter for which disclosure is compelled must be a matter of decided law, rather than a mere opinion rendered by an academic. For example, where an attorney is arguing that a certain transfer of assets should be permitted in a bankruptcy proceeding, that attorney need not disclose a law review article, casebook, or op-ed piece in which the author argues that exactly such a transfer of assets should never be permitted. Such a writing need not be disclosed even if the author of the article is a leading expert on the area of law, and the article contains strong and well-written arguments in support of the position.

Conversely, adverse authority does extend to binding legal materials other than court decisions, including statutes, local ordinances, and decisions of administrative bodies having adjudicative authority.

Directly adverse

The requirement that the authority be directly adverse has been a source of uncertainty. Attorneys are keen to distinguish adverse authority by finding sufficient differences in the facts of previous adverse cases to argue that the previous case does not apply to the current situation. Such argument essentially seeks to present the prior authority as not being adverse at all, because it applies to sufficiently different facts. In order to counter the tendency of attorney's to diminish the precedential value of adverse authority, such authority is weighed by an objective standard in determining whether it should be disclosed. The standard is whether the judge sitting on the case would consider the authority to be important, or if she would feel misled if the authority were not disclosed.

Controlling jurisdiction

Adverse authority from another jurisdiction need not be disclosed. In state courts, that generally includes cases decided by courts of other states. In federal district courts, that generally includes cases decided by district courts in other federal districts, and by the federal courts of appeal other than the particular court of appeal that the district court falls under. State court decisions need not be reported to federal courts unless the federal court is deciding a matter that falls under state, rather than federal, law; decisions of federal courts other than the Supreme Court of the United States need not be reported to state courts.
