= En banc =

Appellate legal proceeding

In law, an en banc (/ˌɑːn ˈbɑːŋk/; alternatively in banc, in banco or in bank; French: [ɑ̃ bɑ̃]) session is one in which all the judges of a court sit to hear a case, not just one judge or a smaller panel of judges.

For courts like the United States Courts of Appeals, in which each case is normally heard by a three-judge panel instead of the entire court, an en banc review is usually used for only very complex or important cases or when the court believes there is an especially significant issue at stake. En banc is a French phrase meaning "in bench." Convening an en banc court may enhance a court’s legitimacy by ensuring the quality and consistency of its case law and by signalling broad collective ownership of outcomes by all the court's judges.

== United States ==
=== Supreme Court ===
In the United States Supreme Court, practically all final decisions are heard and decided by all nine sitting justices (unless recused).

=== Federal courts of appeals ===
Whereas, federal appeals courts in the United States sometimes grant rehearing to reconsider the decision of a panel of the court (consisting of only three judges) in which the case concerns a matter of exceptional public importance or the panel's decision appears to conflict with a prior decision of the court. In rarer instances, an appellate court will order hearing en banc as an initial matter instead of the panel hearing it first.

Cases in United States courts of appeals are typically heard by three-judge panels, randomly chosen from the sitting appeals court judges of that circuit. If a party loses before a circuit panel, it may appeal for a rehearing en banc. A majority of the active circuit judges must agree to hear or rehear a case en banc. The Federal Rules of Appellate Procedure state that en banc proceedings are disfavored but may be ordered to maintain uniformity of decisions within the circuit or if the issue is exceptionally important (Fed. R. App. P. 40(a), 40(c)).

Each federal circuit has its own particular rules regarding en banc proceedings. The circuit rules for the Seventh Circuit provide a process where, under certain circumstances, a panel can solicit the consent of the other circuit judges to overrule a prior decision and thus avoid the need for an en banc proceeding. Federal law provides that for courts with more than 15 judges, an en banc hearing may consist of "such number of members of its en banc courts as may be prescribed by rule of the court of appeals." The Ninth Circuit, with 29 judges, uses this procedure, and its en banc court consists of 11 judges. The Ninth Circuit can theoretically rehear an en banc decision before the full 29-judge court; but as of 2022 this has never occurred, although judges have unsuccessfully called for it in nine cases. The Fifth and Sixth Circuits have 17 and 16 judges respectively, but neither has adopted a limited en banc procedure. The FISA Court sat en banc for the first time in 2017 in a case concerning bulk data collection.

=== Federal district courts ===
Although it is uncommon and not specifically authorized by any rule or statute, federal district courts have sometimes heard cases en banc. In a 2022 article, the law professor Maggie Gardner listed over 140 potential examples, some of which later reached the Supreme Court as Hickman v. Taylor, Mistretta v. United States, and Zadvydas v. Davis.

== United Kingdom ==
The UK Supreme Court has criteria in place to determine the size of the panel that sits on any one case, and particularly important cases can be heard by a panel comprising all but one of the justices. This has been described as sitting en banc by Lady Hale, then President of the Supreme Court.

The Supreme Court has twelve justices, and cases are ordinarily decided by panels of five. The largest possible panel is 11 of the 12 justices, to prevent a deadlock. Eleven judges may sit on a panel:

- in cases where the court is being asked, or may decide, to depart from a previous decision;
- in cases of high constitutional importance or great public importance;
- in cases where a conflict between decisions in the House of Lords (as a court), Privy Council (as a court) and/or the Supreme Court has to be reconciled; or
- in cases raising an important point in relation to the European Convention on Human Rights.

As of October 2019, only two cases have been heard by the maximum panel of 11 justices, both arising out of political events relating to Brexit: R (Miller) v Secretary of State for Exiting the European Union ("Miller I"), which was heard by all 11 serving justices (there was one judicial vacancy at the time) and decided by an 8–3 majority, and R (Miller) v The Prime Minister and Cherry v Advocate General for Scotland ("Miller II"), which was heard by 11 of the 12 serving justices (Lord Briggs did not sit) and decided unanimously.

== Japan ==
The Supreme Court of Japan, which has a total of fifteen justices, ordinarily hears cases in panels of five judges, but is required to hear cases en banc (by the "Grand Bench", 大法廷 daihōtei) when ruling on most constitutional issues, when overturning a previous decision of the Supreme Court, when the five-judge panel is unable to reach a decision, and in other limited cases.

== Australia ==
Appeals to the High Court of Australia (the federal supreme court of Australia) are sometimes heard by the full bench of all seven justices. Cases that are heard by the full bench include cases of constitutional significance, or where the court is being asked to overrule a previous decision, or cases that involve principles of major public importance.

The state supreme courts and the Federal Court of Australia often hear appeals by a "full court" of judges, but this does not normally include all the judges on the court. For example, in New South Wales, particularly important appeal cases are heard by five judges, chosen from a pool of more than a dozen appeal judges.

Some court buildings in Australia include a courtroom specifically called the "banco court", which is a large courtroom where the judges of the court can sit en banc - with in banco, the Medieval Latin term, being preferred in Australia over the Norman French equivalent en banc. They are used for full bench hearings, as well as ceremonies.

== France ==
In France, the Court of Cassation (France's highest judicial court) sometimes hears cases that represent very significant legal issues, as well as cases in which lower appeals courts have failed to apply its rulings as ordered, in a formation known as the Assemblée plénière (Plenary Session), but this does not include all the judges of the court (of which there can be up to 58). This consists of a nineteen-member panel composed of the Chief Justice of the Court of Cassation and three members from each of the Court's six divisions.

== See also ==
- Full court

== Sources ==
- Sanders, Anthony B.; Liles, Matt (2023). "En Banc or In Bank? Take a Seat..." (PDF). Judicature. 107 (2). Bolch Judicial Institute at Duke University School of Law: 34–39.
- Kadlec, Ondřej (2025). "Managing Judicial Legitimacy: The Role of Grand Chambers in National and International Courts". International & Comparative Law Quarterly. 74 (3): 619–647. doi:10.1017/S0020589325101115.
