= Privilege log =

A privilege log is a document that describes documents or other items withheld from production in a civil lawsuit under a claim that the documents are "privileged" from disclosure due to the attorney–client privilege, work product doctrine, joint defense doctrine, or some other privilege.

A party withholding privileged documents from discovery complies with Rule 26(b)(5)(A) of the Federal Rules of Civil Procedure by producing a log containing the following information for each withheld document: the date, type of document, author(s), recipient(s), general subject-matter of the document, and the privilege being claimed (e.g., attorney-client). A production log or similar document may explain where documents on the privilege log were found, identify lawyers on the log, or provide other information.

Whenever a claim of privilege is made, the person making the claim has the burden of showing that the privilege applies. Therefore, it is generally the withholding party's burden to provide sufficient information on its privilege log to allow the opposing party to assess the claim of privilege, inquire further, or seek in camera review of the withheld documents or other Court involvement, if necessary.
