= Robert Garrow =

American murderer and suspected serial killer

- Garrow after his arrest for rape in 1961
- Born: Robert Francis Garrow Sr. March 4, 1936; Dannemora, New York, U.S.
- Died: September 11, 1978 (aged 42); Beacon, New York, U.S.
- Cause of death: Gunshot wounds
- Known for: Buried Bodies Case
- Status: Deceased
- Convictions: Second degree murder First degree rape
- Penalty: 25 years to life in prison

Details
- Date: July 11–29, 1973
- Location: New York
- Killed: 4–6+
- Weapons: Hunting knife.30-30 rifle.32 pistol (escape only)

Robert Francis Garrow Sr. (March 4, 1936 – September 11, 1978) was an American serial rapist, spree killer, and suspected serial killer who was active in New York State in the early 1970s. After committing several rapes, Garrow went on an 18-day killing spree, stabbing four people to death before being apprehended. His criminal trial, known as the Buried Bodies Case, became an important case in legal ethics after his attorneys, Francis Belge and Frank Armani, refused to disclose the location of the bodies of two of his victims, citing attorney–client privilege. Garrow was later shot dead while escaping from prison in 1978.

Garrow is suspected of committing other murders. He has been described as the "best suspect" in the May 1973 murder of McMaster University student Adele Komorowski in Hamilton, Canada.

== Early life ==
Robert Garrow Jr. was born in Dannemora, New York, to French-Canadian parents Robert Omer Garrow and his wife, Margaret, who were both poor farmers. His oldest sister would later become the mother of another murderer, Suzanne Basso. Garrow later claimed his parents were violent disciplinarians who regularly physically abused their children with whatever was handy, even bricks. His accounts have been repeated by his siblings.

Police were called several times throughout the years to break up violent fights between Garrow and his alcoholic father. After a particularly brutal episode when Garrow was aged 15, he was sent to a prison farm to work. Garrow later reported a long history of sexual dysfunction and paraphilias, committed several acts of bestiality with the farm animals he worked with throughout childhood and adolescence, and would often masturbate with milking machines.

Garrow joined the United States Air Force upon his release but was court-martialed one year later for stealing money from a superior officer. He spent six months in a military prison in Florida.

== Criminal history ==
Garrow returned to New York in 1957, where he married and fathered a son. His life did not improve, however; he was fired from a series of menial jobs, including from a fast food restaurant he burglarized, and was involved in an abusive relationship with a man he later described as a sadist. Garrow was arrested for raping a 16-year-old schoolgirl and attacking her boyfriend in 1961. He pleaded guilty to first degree rape and was sentenced to 10 to 20 years in prison. Garrow was paroled in 1968. Soon after he was released, he committed a series of rapes, and many of his victims were children. He was arrested for the rape of two prepubescent girls, but jumped bail and became a fugitive.

In July 1973, Garrow murdered four people, including a young woman whom he kidnapped and repeatedly raped before killing, and a high school-aged camper in the Adirondacks a few days later. Three witnesses escaped and sought police, spurring a twelve-day statewide manhunt that was, at the time, the largest in New York State history. He stole a 1968 Pontiac Tempest from an all-boys Christian summer camp named Deerfoot Lodge, after which road blocks were set up at intersections throughout Adirondack Park requiring motorists to open vehicle trunks for law enforcement to thoroughly search. Motorists were warned not to stop for anyone on foot near the roads for fear that Garrow might have tried to pose as a hitchhiker. He was cornered in the woods 60 miles (100 km) north of the murder scene, and was shot in the foot, arm, and back by Environmental Conservation Officer Hilary J. LeBlanc. He survived, alleging that he was partially paralyzed.

Garrow was treated at CVPH Medical Center in Plattsburgh, New York, where doctors disbelieved his claims of paralysis. He sued the State of New York for $10 million, alleging that the state's doctors had been negligent in treating the gunshot wound, leading to his alleged paralysis. He was moved to a medium security prison in exchange for dropping the lawsuit, and was later found to be feigning his paralysis. Garrow pleaded not guilty by reason of insanity, but the jury rejected his plea and found him guilty of second-degree murder, sentencing him to a term of 25 years to life in prison. Garrow began his sentence at Clinton Correctional Facility (maximum security) in Dannemora on July 2, 1974. Due to his alleged paralysis, however, he repeatedly requested transfer to the Elderly and Handicapped Unit (minimum security) within the medium-security Fishkill Correctional Facility. In September 1977, a death threat against Garrow prompted his transfer to Auburn Correctional Facility (maximum security). It was not until early 1978 that he was transferred back to Fishkill.

A grand jury indicted one of Garrow's lawyers – Francis Belge, with whom he had shared the location of two victims' bodies – for violating §§ 4200(1) and 4143 of the New York Public Health Law: the first such section required that a decent burial be accorded the dead, while the second required "anyone knowing of the death of a person without medical attendance, to report the same to proper authorities." The trial court granted the attorneys' motion to dismiss the indictment on the grounds that the communications between Garrow and Belge as to the whereabouts of the bodies were protected by the attorney–client privilege, and "in the interests of justice." As to the privilege, the court held that Belge's professional duties prohibited him from revealing information that would incriminate his client, reasoning that the Fifth Amendment rights of criminal defendants against self-incrimination would be circumvented if "compulsory disclosure can be exacted through his attorney." However, the court noted that if Belge had been charged with obstruction of justice "under a proper statute," rather than a rarely applied "pseudo-criminal statute," the requisite balancing of the accused's Fifth Amendment rights against the rights of society to punish culpable behavior would have rendered the court's decision much more difficult.

== Escape and death ==
Landing himself in a less secure facility due to his false claims of paralysis, Garrow escaped from Fishkill on September 8, 1978. He was in possession of a .32 caliber pistol he had obtained from his son, who concealed the weapon inside a bucket of chicken he brought to his father during a visit. Garrow then spurred another search after he was discovered missing from his cell. The false claims about his paralysis kept the guards unsuspecting, as he scaled a fifteen-foot-high (4.6 m) fence to escape the prison grounds.

When authorities searched Garrow's cell, they found a hit list including Armani and Belge's names. Armani gave police advice about where Garrow might have gone. This information led police to discover Garrow hiding in a wooded area near the prison. He had been concealed in the brush and leaves, waiting for the search to widen and he could continue running. Garrow was spotted by guards a few hundred yards away from the prison walls. He opened fire on his pursuers, wounding Correction Officer Dominic Arena in the leg, but was shot three times and killed by Correction Officer Frank Lago.

== Aftermath ==
In 2013, police in Canada described Garrow as the "best suspect" in the May 15, 1973, murder of McMaster University student Adele Komorowski in Hamilton, Canada. Although the murder has not been conclusively linked to Garrow, retired Hamilton detective Clive Paul said, "Based on what I've read [on CBC Hamilton], I'd say the case is solved. I'd have to learn more, but it's the best suspect we’ve seen. The circumstances fit perfectly."

Garrow is also a suspect in the murder of 18-year-old Ruth Whitman in 1959.

== Murder victims ==
- December 8, 1959: Ruth Whitman, 18 (suspected)
- May 15, 1973: Adele Komorowski, 26 (suspected)
- July 11: Alicia Hauck, 16
- July 20: Daniel Porter, 23
- July 20: Susan Petz, 20
- July 29: Philip Domblewski, 18

== See also ==
- Attorney–client privilege
