= Protective order =

Protective order may refer to:

- Injunction
- Restraining order
- In civil discovery under United States federal law, an order restricting or setting terms for disclosure or discovery
