= Upjohn Co. v. United States =

Upjohn v. United States
- Supreme Court of the United States

Argued November 5, 1980 Decided January 13, 1981
- Full case name: Upjohn Company, et al. v. United States, et al.
- Citations: 449 U.S. 383 (more) 101 S. Ct. 677; 66 L. Ed. 2d 584; 1981 U.S. LEXIS 56; 49 U.S.L.W. 4093; 81-1 U.S. Tax Cas. (CCH) ¶ 9138; 1980-81 Trade Cas. (CCH) ¶ 63,797; Fed. Sec. L. Rep. (CCH) ¶ 97,817; 47 A.F.T.R.2d (RIA) 523; 30 Fed. R. Serv. 2d (Callaghan) 1101

Case history
- Prior: United States v. Upjohn Co., 600 F.2d 1223 (6th Cir. 1979); cert. granted, 445 U.S. 925 (1980).

Holding
- (1) District Court's test, of availability of attorney–client privilege, was objectionable as it restricted availability of privilege to those corporate officers who played “substantial role” in deciding and directing corporation's legal response; (2) where communications at issue were made by corporate employees to counsel for corporation acting as such, at direction of corporate superiors in order to secure legal advice from counsel, and employees were aware that they were being questioned so that corporation could obtain advice, such communications were protected; and (3) where notes and memoranda sought by government were work products based on oral statements of witnesses, they were, if they revealed communications, protected by privilege, and to extent they did not reveal communications, they revealed attorney's mental processes in evaluating the communications and disclosure would not be required simply on showing of substantial need and inability to obtain equivalent without undue hardship.

Court membership
- Chief Justice Warren E. Burger Associate Justices William J. Brennan Jr. · Potter Stewart; Byron White · Thurgood Marshall; Harry Blackmun · Lewis F. Powell Jr. William Rehnquist · John P. Stevens

Case opinions
- Majority: Rehnquist, joined by Brennan, Stewart, White, Marshall, Blackmun, Powell, Stevens, Burger (parts I, III)
- Concurrence: Burger

Upjohn Co. v. United States, 449 U.S. 383 (1981), was a U.S. Supreme Court case holding that the Upjohn company could invoke the attorney–client privilege to protect communications made between company lawyers and non-management employees. In doing so, the Court rejected the narrower control group test that had previously governed many organizational attorney–client privilege issues. Under the control group test, only employees who exercised direct control over the managerial decisions of the company were eligible to have their communications with corporate lawyers protected. The case also expanded the scope of the work-product doctrine.

While the Upjohn decision did not explicitly mention a warning procedure, the case gave rise to a procedure called an "Upjohn warning", in which a company's lawyer explains that the lawyer represents the company and not the individual employee with whom the lawyer is dealing. This is intended to ensure that the employee understands that the company can waive the attorney-client privilege at any time and disclose the contents of the conversation between the lawyer and the employee, even if the employee objects. In subsequent cases, failure to give an Upjohn warning has led to the employee being able to claim privilege over communications with company lawyers.

== Background, procedural posture and issues ==
The case was taken by the Court on appeal from the United States Court of Appeals for the Sixth Circuit, which had held that the attorney–client privilege did not apply to communication between Upjohn's middle management officials and the company's attorneys. The Sixth Circuit had also ruled that the work-product doctrine did not apply to the tax summons the company had received as a result of some of its unlawful business practices.

Prior to the decision, a circuit split existed on the issue of attorney-client privilege in corporate representations. The dominant view was the "control group" test, under which privilege between an attorney and a corporation only extended to communications with decision-makers (i.e. senior executives) of the company, the rationale being that (1) only those individuals could cause the company to act on the lawyer's advice; (2) an expansive privilege would make it easy for corporations to shield themselves from discovery; and (3) a bright line between privileged and non-privileged communication would allow corporations and judges to easily determine who could and could not exercise privilege. This view was followed consistently by the federal courts until 1970, when the United States Court of Appeals for the Seventh Circuit adopted a "subject matter" test under which other employees' communications with company lawyers could be subject to privilege, if made in relation to their employment and at the direction of superiors. Some other federal courts adopted this view during the 1970s, with some maintaining the control group test and others adopting a hybrid of the two.

== Decision of the Court ==
In a unanimous 9–0 decision, Justice William Rehnquist wrote the opinion of the Court in which it reversed the Sixth Circuit's holding. The Supreme Court held that the communications of lower ranking employees were protected by attorney–client privilege when protection was necessary to defend against litigation. The Court also reversed and remanded the tax summonses issue.

Chief Justice Warren Burger wrote a concurring opinion in which he supported the Court's decision, but advocated a clear bright-line that would privilege any employee or former employee's communications with attorneys, if the attorneys' inquiry was authorized by management, and was designed to assess legal responses or issues with regard to the employee's conduct.

Upjohn is considered one of the leading cases on attorney–client privilege.

== See also ==
- List of United States Supreme Court cases, volume 449
- Federal Rules of Evidence
- Attorney–client privilege
- Work product doctrine
