= Withdrawal from representation =

Concept in US law

Withdrawal from representation, in United States law, occurs where an attorney terminates a relationship of representing a client. There are two types of withdrawal: mandatory and voluntary. Mandatory withdrawal occurs where a circumstance arises under which an attorney must terminate the representation, while voluntary withdrawal occurs where circumstances permit the attorney to terminate the representation at the attorney's election. Where litigation has been filed and an attorney is representing the client in court, permission of the court must usually be sought in support of an attorney's withdrawal.

Rule 1.16 of the American Bar Association Model Rules of Professional Conduct addresses withdrawal from representation.

== Mandatory withdrawal ==
There are many circumstances which require that an attorney must withdraw from a case:

1. The client fires the attorney.
2. The attorney determines that he is not competent to continue representing the client in a matter.
3. A conflict of interest arises under which the attorney's continued representation of multiple clients impairs the attorney's obligations to the individuals.
4. The client insists upon advancing a frivolous claim.
5. Continued representation would violate the rules of professional responsibility.
6. The attorney is in a physical or emotional state that seriously impairs the attorney's ability to continue the representation.
7. It is likely that the attorney will be called as a necessary witness as to a contested issue in the proceeding, and that testimony cannot be obtained elsewhere.
8. The attorney discovers that the client is using the attorney's services to further a criminal act.

== Voluntary withdrawal ==
An attorney may voluntarily terminate the attorney-client relationship at any time and without reason, if this will not have a material adverse effect on the interests of the client. Even if the withdrawal will be adverse to the client the attorney may still withdraw for a number of reasons:

1. The client is engaged in illegal or fraudulent activity.
2. The client fails to pay fees as agreed.
3. The financial burden on the attorney of continuing the representation is too great.
4. The client refuses to follow the advice of counsel, or engages in acts relating to the representation without informing the attorney or seeking the attorney's advice.
5. The attorney is engaged with co-counsel of the client's choosing, and is unable to work with that co-counsel.

== Rules governing withdrawal ==
Where the attorney withdraws from representation, he has a continuing duty to maintain the confidentiality of information provided by the client during the relationship, except to the extent that the attorney may need to reveal confidences in a lawsuit to recover unpaid fees owed. However, the attorney must refund any portion of the retainer or other fees paid that exceeds what the attorney has earned during the representation. The attorney must notify the client of the withdrawal prior to ceasing his work on the case, must make a reasonable effort to assist the client in obtaining new counsel, and must cooperate with that new counsel during the transition to the new representation. The attorney must also, on request, deliver the client's file to the client or the client's new counsel.
