= R v Gruenke =

- Supreme Court of Canada

Hearing: May 10, 1991 Judgment: October 24, 1991
- Full case name: Adele Rosemary Gruenke v Her Majesty The Queen
- Citations: [1991] 3 S.C.R. 263
- Prior history: Appeal from the Manitoba Court of Appeal
- Ruling: Gruenke appeal dismissed

Court membership
- Chief Justice: Antonio Lamer; Puisne Justices: Bertha Wilson, Gérard La Forest, Claire L'Heureux-Dubé, John Sopinka, Charles Gonthier, Peter Cory, Beverley McLachlin, William Stevenson

Reasons given
- Majority: Lamer, joined by La Forest, Sopinka, Cory, McLachlin, Stevenson, and Iacobucci
- Concurrence: L'Heureux-Dubé, joined by Gonthier

R v Gruenke [1991] 3 S.C.R. 263 is a leading Supreme Court of Canada decision on privilege. The court developed a case-by-case test for determining if a communication is privileged. Prior to the test, only communications that fell into one of narrow set of privilege classes could gain protection from being submitted in a court of law.

== Background ==
Adele Rosemary Gruenke was a 22-year-old reflexologist (a type of therapy similar to acupressure). Philip Barnett, an 82-year-old friend and client of Gruenke, had loaned her a significant amount of money including money to start a reflexology clinic. They lived together for a time in a platonic relationship – he had even put her in his will – until he began to make advances to her, at which point she moved home with her mother. Barnett's advances became more aggressive, to the point where she and her boyfriend plotted to kill him. One night in November 1986, she met with Barnett in his car and a fight broke out. She and her boyfriend beat Barnett to death.

Gruenke, distraught, then spoke to a pastor and counsellor about her involvement in the murder, and the planning that went into it.

At trial the conversation between Greunke, the counsellor, and pastor was admitted and proved sufficient to convict Gruenke of first-degree murder.

== Opinion of the court ==
The court found that the trial judge was correct in admitting the evidence.

Chief Justice Antonio Lamer, writing for the majority, noted that Canadian law does not recognize privilege in religious communications; however, there may be situations where such a privilege may be required.

To accommodate this need the court adopted a four-step test proposed by the American jurist John Henry Wigmore to determine whether privilege is required.

1. the communications must originate in a confidence that they will not be disclosed;
2. this element of confidentiality must be essential to the full and satisfactory maintenance of the relation between the parties;
3. the relation must be one which in the opinion of the community ought to be sedulously fostered; and
4. the injury that would inure to the relation by the disclosure of the communications must be greater than the benefit thereby gained for the correct disposal of litigation.

In application to the facts of the case, Lamer found that they did not meet the requirements of the Wigmore test and so the communication was not privileged.

== See also ==
- Freedom of religion in Canada
- Priest–penitent privilege
