= Adverse =

Adverse or adverse interest, in law, is anything that functions contrary to a party's interest.

This word should not be confused with averse.

The most common use of the term is "an interest, claim , or right that is against another’s interest." This occurs not only in the law; examples also pop up in accounting. Furthermore, an adverse interest is an exception to agency law. The law regarding this exception is narrowly defined, so a judge will instruct a trial jury on the specific law.

A second use of the phrase is when some "witness with adverse interest means the witness is hostile. A hostile witness wants different results of the lawsuit than the party who calls them."

== Adverse possession ==
A third use of the word "adverse" is "In real property, adverse interest means a person who is not the owner of the land or house owns an interest in the property."

In property law, adverse possession refers to an interest in real property which is contrary to the in-fact owner of the property. For example, an easement may permit some amount of access to property which might otherwise constitute a trespass.

== See also ==
- Adverse inference
- Adverse party
- Adverse possession
- Adverse witness
