= Legal professional privilege =

Secrecy of law advice to clients

In common law jurisdictions and some civil law jurisdictions, legal professional privilege protects all communications between a professional legal adviser (a solicitor, barrister or attorney) and their clients from being disclosed without the permission of the client. The privilege is that of the client and not that of the lawyer.

The purpose behind this legal principle is to protect an individual's ability to access the justice system by encouraging complete disclosure to legal advisers without the fear that any disclosure of those communications may prejudice the client in the future.

== History ==
The common law principle of legal professional privilege is of extremely long standing. The earliest recorded instance of the principle in English case-law dates from 1577 in the case of Berd v. Lovelace the full report of which states:

Thomas Hawtry, gentleman, was served with a subpoena to testify his knowledge touching the cause in variance; and made oath that he hath been, and yet is a solicitor in this suit, and hath received several fees of the defendant; which being informed to the Master of the Rolls, it is ordered that the said Thomas Hawtry shall not be compelled to be deposed, touching the same; and that he shall be in no danger of any contempt, touching the not executing of the same process.

The principle originated as protection for individuals when accessing the knowledge and legal resources available to a lawyer and was said to stem from the "oath and honour" of the lawyer, a sort of special contractual relationship. It was based on the fact that the ordinary citizen could not safely navigate the complexities of the law and justice system without some assistance. However, without protection the quality of the advice would suffer as clients would be discouraged from making full disclosure to their legal representatives. As Lord Brougham put it in Greenough v Gaskell (1833):

The foundation of this rule is not difficult to discover. It is not (as has sometimes been said) on account of any particular importance which the law attributes to the business of legal professors, or any particular disposition to afford them protection ... But it is out of regard to the interests of justice, which cannot be upholden, and to the administration of justice, which cannot go on without the aid of men skilled in jurisprudence, in the practice of the courts, and in those matters affecting rights and obligations which form the subject of all judicial proceedings. If the privilege did not exist at all, every one would be thrown upon his own legal resources, deprived of professional assistance, a man would not venture to consult any skilful person, or would only dare tell his counsellor half his case".

== Australia ==
The Evidence Act 1995 (Cth) and identical provisions in the Evidence Act 1995 of NSW and Tasmania now control when privilege prevents evidence is adduced during trial in any court (as defined by a proceeding bound by the laws of evidence). The rules of court in NSW extends the definitions in the Evidence Act to discovery and inspection of documents. The right, under legislation, has been renamed to reflect the fact that it is a right of the client. It is now client legal privilege (as opposed to legal professional privilege). The courts regard privilege as a "substantive general principle which plays an important role in the effective and efficient administration of justice by the courts", not a mere rule of evidence. As such, it extends to all forms of compulsory disclosure, including search warrants. Furthermore, although the legislature may restrict privilege "the law [shouldn't] ease the way for the legislature to [restrict privilege]".

== Canada ==
Solicitor–client privilege was initially a common law evidentiary principle similar to hearsay but has since become recognized as a substantive rule that is constitutionally protected. This recognition began with R. v. Solosky (1979) where Justice Dickson, in tracing its history, regarded it as a "fundamental civil and legal right" that guaranteed clients a right to privacy in their communications with their lawyers, even outside a courtroom.

In R. v. McClure [2001] 1 S.C.R. 445, the Court found that solicitor–client privilege was a principle of fundamental justice, hinting that it may be protected under Section 7 of the Charter.

In its general sense, Canada has adopted John Wigmore's definition of solicitor client privilege:

Where legal advice of any kind is sought from a professional legal adviser in his capacity as such, the communications relating to that purpose, made in confidence by the client, are at his instance permanently protected from disclosure by himself or by the legal adviser, except the protection be waived.

Justice Lamer set out the test for solicitor–client privilege in Decoteaux v. Mierzwinski:

1. The confidentiality of communications between solicitor and client may be raised in any circumstances where such communications are likely to be disclosed without the client's consent.
2. Unless the law provides otherwise, when and to the extent that the legitimate exercise of a right would interfere with another person's right to have his communications with his lawyer kept confidential, the resulting conflict should be resolved in favour of protecting the confidentiality.
3. When the law gives someone the authority to do something which, in the circumstances of the case, might interfere with that confidentiality, the decision to do so and the choice of means of exercising that authority should be determined with a view to not interfering with it except to the extent absolutely necessary in order to achieve the ends sought by the enabling legislation.
4. Acts providing otherwise in situations under paragraph 2 and enabling legislation referred to in paragraph 3 must be interpreted restrictively.

== England and Wales ==
In England and Wales, the rules on legal professional privilege are set out in common law. The Civil Procedure Rules 1998 ('CPR') Rule 31.15 establishes a right to inspect documents in civil litigation, and provide that a party to whom a document has been disclosed (i.e. mentioned or relied upon in litigation) has a right to inspect that document (if such inspection would be proportionate given the nature of the case) - except where the party making disclosure has the right to withhold such inspection.

One of these rights is legal professional privilege. It is a privilege that attaches to the client (not to the lawyer) in a client–lawyer relationship. It does not extend to advisors who are not legally qualified. It may only, therefore, be waived by the client. In the law of England and Wales, legal professional privilege is divided into two types: advice privilege, and litigation privilege, the former category being more absolutely and broadly defined than the latter.

== Scotland ==
Legal professional privilege applies in Scotland. the Law Society of Scotland regulates solicitors in respect of it. For Advocates, this matter is regulated by the Faculty of Advocates Code of Conduct. In October 2022, the Inner House of the Court of Session determined that materials subject to legal professional privilege could not be used by the Scottish Legal Complaints Commission for its investigations without client consent.

== Turkey ==
The Turkish Advocacy Code outlines two types of legal professional privilege: legal advice privilege and litigation privilege. Legal professional privilege prohibits—subject to potential waiver by the client—the disclosure of lawyer-client communications made for the purpose of obtaining and giving legal advice. Litigation privilege prohibits—subject to potential waiver by the client—the disclosure of client-third party and lawyer-third party communications made in preparation of contemplated or pending litigation, including during settlement negotiations. The Turkish Advocacy Code's rationale for the rules of legal professional privilege is that confidentiality enables lawyers to accurately encourage strong cases, which improves the efficiency of the legal system.

There is a fraud exception to both litigation privilege and legal advice privilege.

== United States ==
Attorney–client privilege is a legal concept that protects communications between a client and their attorney and keeps the communications confidential in both civil and criminal cases. The privilege encourages open and honest communication between clients and attorneys. However, in the United States, not all state courts treat attorney communications as privileged. For instance, Washington state law and the federal courts in applying federal law protect client only communications; an attorney's communication is protected as privileged only to the extent that it contains or reveals the client's communications. In contrast, California state law protects the attorney's confidential communications regardless of whether they contain, refer to, or reveal the client's communications. In addition, the United States Supreme Court has ruled that the privilege generally does not terminate upon the client's death. See Swidler & Berlin v. United States.

== Exceptions ==
Privilege cannot be relied upon where the communication is used to facilitate a crime.

== In civil law jurisdictions ==
Civil law jurisdictions approach privilege differently from common law jurisdictions.

Some countries, such as China, do not have legal professional privilege.

== See also ==
- Attorney–client privilege, the American equivalent.
- Privilege (evidence)
- Confidentiality
- Duty of confidentiality
- Admissible evidence
- Accountant–client privilege
- Physician–patient privilege
- Priest–penitent privilege
- Reporters' privilege
- Spousal privilege
- State Secrets Privilege
- Public Interest Immunity
