= Duty of confidentiality =

Attorney's obligation respect the confidentiality of their clients' affairs

In common law jurisdictions, the duty of confidentiality obliges solicitors (or attorneys) to respect the confidentiality of their clients' affairs. Information that solicitors obtain about their clients' affairs may be confidential, and must not be used for the benefit of persons not authorized by the client. Confidentiality is a prerequisite for legal professional privilege to hold.

== The duty and its source ==
The lawyer-client relationship has historically been characterised as one of confidence. This duty also constitutes part of the broader foundation for lawyer's fiduciary duties to their clients.

=== Rationales for the duty ===
The maintenance of full and frank disclosure between lawyers and their clients is the main justification for the duty of confidentiality. The basis for this rationale is utilitarianism, in that it works to promote the work of solicitors, who are officers of the court. It allows clients to freely discuss intimate details without fear that such information could be subsequently disclosed to the general public. In turn, public confidence in lawyers and the legal system is maintained and promoted. Further, the duty of confidentiality is a constant reminder to lawyers of the loyalty they owe to their clients.

Another rationale is to protect the human dignity of the client.

In criminal cases, confidentiality is also justified to prevent the use of tricked confessions or admissions.

=== Source of the duty ===
The duty is sourced from a combination of contract law and equity arising from the distinctive relationship between lawyer and client. The solicitor or attorney is an agent of the client under the law of agency. In contract, the duty arises from terms contained in the retainer agreement. Complementarily, equity prohibits unauthorised use or disclosure of confidential information. In most jurisdictions, the duty is codified in the terms of legal professional rules, such as the Model Code of Professional Responsibility.

Although the duty of confidentiality and fiduciary duties have common origins, they cannot be equated as not all fiduciary duties attract duties of confidentiality and vice versa.

== Scope of the duty ==
=== In contract ===
As the lawyer-client duty of confidentiality is primarily sourced in contract law, the wording of implied terms in the retainer agreement determines its scope of operation. Despite its importance, there have been few judicial attempts to resolve the extent of the implied term.

=== In equity ===
In equity, protection is attached to information that is capable of meeting the test of confidentiality - whether the information was already public knowledge and whether its communication was for a limited purpose. While this test may indicate a more limited scope of confidentiality under equity, by requiring information to be deemed confidential before falling under the scope, on another level equity may secure a broader temporal protection for confidential information. The duty under contract expires on termination of the legal retainer, whereas the duty under equity remains intact until the information is no longer confidential, which may occur long after the expiration of the contractual retainer.

=== In professional rules ===
Legal professional rules have tended to adopt the broad view of the scope of duty recognised in contract law. The obligation to retain information in confidence, according to the professional rules in Australian jurisdictions is premised on its connection with the legal retainer rather than the source of the information. Hence, the professional rules seem to imply that information gained in connection with the legal retainer is deemed confidential. However, though the rules emphasise the importance of the duty of confidentiality, this is not a hard rule. Not all information connected with the retainer meets the legal test of confidentiality. The duty of confidence applies to "any information, which is confidential to a client and acquired by [a] practitioner or [a] practitioner's firm during the client's engagement." For barristers, it is "confidential information obtained by [a] barrister concerning any person."

=== Compared to legal professional privilege ===
Though the duty of confidentiality shares a common origin, goals, and similarities with legal professional privilege, they are distinct in at least three ways. Firstly, privilege is not dependent on a contractual, equitable or professional duty to clients. Rather, it is based upon arguments of public policy. Secondly, communications protected by confidentiality are more numerous than those protected by privilege. Privileged communications are a subset of confidential communication. Nonetheless, loss of privilege does not necessarily automatically destroy the duty to confidentiality if it has arisen independently of the privilege. Finally, privileged information is protected from compulsory disclosure, unless abrogated by statute or waived. Non-privileged confidential information on the other hand must be disclosed to judicial, statutory, or other legal compulsion. In particular, the public interest in discovering the truth trumps private duties to respect confidence.

== Limits and exceptions to the duty ==
Though the duty to confidentiality is often expressed in absolute terms in professional rules, there are circumstances where the duty can be breached. The breach of the duty in certain contexts is justified through the balancing of the often competing interests of the client and proper administration of justice. The duty is not absolute and can be limited as provided by the law.

=== Client authorization ===
As lawyer-client confidentiality exists for the benefit of the client, the confidence is the client's to waive or modify. Hence, the lawyer can reveal confidential information to third parties where the client allows such an action. However, consent to allow the disclosure of confidential information does not entitle the lawyer to disclose or use the information for other purposes than those specified by the client.

The authorization does not necessarily have to be explicit. It can be inferred from the terms or nature of the retainer agreement. The idea that all information imparted within a retainer is confidential is impracticable. Often, much of that information is communicated so that it can be disclosed to dispose of a matter, claim, or legal issue. Hence, where information is incidental to the conduct of a retainer, client authorisation can be generally taken as given. Nonetheless, where there is uncertainty, express authority should be sought from the client.

=== Disclosure compelled by law ===
Where expressly provided for in statute, lawyers must comply with any parliamentary requirement necessitating breach of the duty to confidentiality. Lord Denning in Parry-Jones v Law Society said at 6-7:

"the solicitor must obey the law, and, in particular, he must comply with the rules made under the authority of statute for the conduct of the profession. If the rules require him to disclose his client's affairs, then he must do so."

Statutory abrogation of the duty is limited in scope and purpose however. Requirements are never blanket decrees for the revelation of confidential information. Rather they are based on upholding the public interest, where such interests override client interests in maintaining confidentiality.

=== Disclosure ostensibly to support lawyer's own interests ===
Lawyers may disclose confidential information relating to the retainer where they are reasonably seeking to collect payment for services rendered. This is justified on policy grounds. If lawyers were unable to disclose such information, many would undertake legal work only where payment is made in advance. This would arguably adversely affect the public's access to justice.

Lawyers may also breach the duty where they are defending themselves against disciplinary or legal proceedings. A client who initiates proceedings against a lawyer effectively waives rights to confidentiality. This is justified on grounds of procedural fairness - a lawyer unable to reveal information relating to the retainer would be unable to defend themselves against such actions.

=== Disclosure of information that is not confidential ===
Clearly, information that is not confidential does not fall under the duty of confidentiality. Disclosure of information that is already in the public domain does not breach the duty. Further, information that was not in the public knowledge at the time of the retainer agreement, is not subject to the duty if it subsequently enters the public domain. The purpose served by maintaining the confidence - the protection of the client - is arguably extinguished.

Nonetheless, the lawyer still owes a duty of loyalty, and clients may feel betrayed if such information is disclosed, even if it becomes public knowledge. Though there are no legal ramifications for disclosure, discretion on part of the lawyer may be in the long term interests of maintaining the propriety of the legal profession.

=== Disclosure for the purpose of probate ===
Another case is for the probate of a last will and testament. Previously confidential communications between the lawyer and testator are no longer secret for the purpose of proving the Will is the intent of the now deceased decedent. In many instances, the will, codicil, or other parts of the estate plan require explanation or interpretation through other proof (extrinsic evidence), such as the attorney's file notes or correspondence from the client.

In certain cases, the client may desire or consent to revelation of personal or family secrets only after his or her death; for example, the Will may leave a legacy to a paramour or a natural child.

== See also ==
- Legal ethics
- Attorney–client privilege (United States Legal Term)
- Solicitor–client privilege (Commonwealth Legal Term)
