= Joint defense privilege =

Extension of attorney–client privilege

The joint defense privilege, or common-interest rule, is an extension of attorney–client privilege. Under "common interest" or "joint defense" doctrine, parties with shared interest in actual or potential litigation against a common adversary may share privileged information without waiving their right to assert attorney–client privilege. Because the joint defense, "privilege sometimes may apply outside the context of actual litigation, what the parties call a 'joint defense' privilege is more aptly termed the 'common interest' rule."

== Purpose ==
"The need to protect the free flow of information from client to attorney logically exists whenever multiple clients share a common interest about a legal matter." The common interest rule serves to protect the confidentiality of communications passing from one party to the attorney for another party where a joint defense effort or strategy has been decided upon and undertaken by the parties and their respective counsel.

== Scope ==
The joint defense privilege does not merely protect statements made by attorney to client or attorney to attorney. The privilege also is held to cover communications made to certain agents of an attorney, including accountants hired to assist in the rendition of legal services. Furthermore, a person need not be a litigant to be a party to a joint defense agreement. The joint defense privilege also applies to "parties or potential parties sharing a common interest in the outcome of a particular claim. Only those communications made in the course of an ongoing common enterprise and intended to further the enterprise are protected.

== Elements ==
A party seeking to assert the joint defense privilege must demonstrate that:

- The communications were made in the course of a joint defense effort.
- The statements were made in furtherance of that effort.

For "common interest" or "joint defense" doctrine to apply, to permit parties with common interest in actual or potential litigation to share privileged information without waiving their right to assert privilege, parties' common interest must be identical and not merely similar, and must be legal and not solely commercial. Furthermore, the protection of the privilege "extends only to communications and not to facts." While a client may refuse to answer questions regarding what it said or wrote to its attorney, it may not refuse to disclose relevant facts "merely because [it] incorporated a statement of such fact into [its] communication to [its] attorney." The joint defense privilege, like the attorney–client privilege, does not protect "underlying facts embodied in a communication between attorney and client."

- The privilege has not been waived.
- The communication must be "given in confidence and that the client reasonably understood it to be so given".

Generally, a client waives the attorney–client privilege when he voluntarily discloses privileged communications to third party. Waiver under joint defense doctrine is essentially the same as that under attorney client privilege. The only difference is that a co-defendant's communication with the other attorney is not a waiver of the confidentiality of that communication. Voluntary disclosure to a third party of purportedly privileged communications has long been considered inconsistent with the privilege. It is well settled that when a party voluntarily discloses privileged communications to a third party, the privilege is waived. Similarly, when a party discloses a portion of otherwise privileged material but withholds the remainder, the privilege is waived only as to those communications actually disclosed, unless a partial waiver would be unfair to the party's adversary. Disclosure alone, without intent, may constitute waiver of the attorney–client privilege. ... "under traditional waiver doctrine a voluntary disclosure ... to a third party waives the attorney–client privilege even if the third party agrees not to disclose the communications to anyone else." In Massachusetts, when an attorney represents more than one client in a particular matter, one client's communication made to the attorney in the presence of the other client or clients is not privileged, as between the clients. In Thompson v. Cashman a lawyer who was acting for both plaintiff and defendant was allowed to testify to a conversation between the lawyer, plaintiff, and defendant. But not all disclosure results in waiver. "Under joint defense privilege, communications between client and his own lawyer remain protected by attorney–client privilege when disclosed to co-defendants or their counsel for purposes of common defense.".

== Burden ==
The burden for showing joint defense is the same as the burden for showing attorney client privilege. The party asserting the joint defense agreement always bears the burden of demonstrating its existence by establishing each element of the attorney-client privilege. Likewise, the party asserting privilege, both in the context of joint defense agreements and otherwise, bears the burden of proving the applicability of the privilege.

== Joint defense agreements ==
"No written agreement is generally required to invoke joint defense privilege." And, although "privileges should be narrowly construed and expansions cautiously extended," courts have found that an oral joint defense agreement may be valid.

Joint defense agreements are not contracts which create whatever rights that signatories chose, but are written notice of defendants' invocation of privileges set forth in common law. As a result, joint defense agreements cannot extend greater protections than legal privileges on which they rest. "A joint defense agreement which purports to [extend greater protections than legal privileges on which it rests] does not accurately set forth the protections which would be given to defendants who sign. In United States v. Stepney, unless the joint defense privilege recognized in this Circuit imposes a duty of loyalty on attorneys who are parties to a joint defense agreement, the duty of loyalty set forth in the proposed agreement would have no effect other than misinforming defendants of the actual scope of their rights. Joint defense privilege did not impose general duty of loyalty to all signing defendants, and thus duty of loyalty set forth in proposed joint defense agreement had no effect other than misinforming defendants of actual scope of their rights. "The proposed joint defense agreement explicitly imposes on signing attorneys not only a duty of confidentiality, but a separate general duty of loyalty to all signing defendants. Such a duty has no foundation in law and, if recognized, would offer little chance of a trial unmarred by conflict of interest and disqualification." When there is a conflict, under "joint defense" doctrine, joint defendant must consent to waiver of conflict of interest for waiver to be effective.
