= New York State Bar Association =

Voluntary bar association for the state of New York

- Established: November 21, 1876
- Type: Legal Society
- Headquarters: Albany, New York
- Location: United States
- Members: 74,000 in 2015
- Staff: 125
- Website: www.nysba.org

The New York State Bar Association (NYSBA) is a voluntary bar association for the state of New York. The mission of the association is to cultivate the science of jurisprudence; promote reform in the law; facilitate the administration of justice; and elevate the standards of integrity, honor, professional skill, and courtesy in the legal profession.

== History ==
NYSBA was founded on November 21, 1876, in Albany, New York, and then incorporated on May 2, 1877, by an act of the state legislature. Its first president was David B. Hill. Elliott Fitch Shepard helped found the association and, in 1884, was its fifth president. Among the reforms to the legislation signed into law that had created the association was the removal of the restrictions on the admission of women to the practice of law.

In 1896, NYSBA proposed the first global means for settling disputes among nations, what is now called the Permanent Court of Arbitration at The Hague.

Its protocol for legal ethics ensued from the NYSBA's 1909 adoption of the 1908 American Bar Association (ABA) Canons of Professional Ethics, which later evolved into the ABA Model Code of Professional Responsibility. In 2001, the NYSBA adopted changes addressing multidisciplinary law practice. The U.S. state of New York was the last state using the code for many years, long after all other states–except California and Maine–had adopted the Model Rules. On December 17, 2008, the administrative committee of the New York courts announced that it had adopted a heavily modified version of the Model Rules, effective April 1, 2009. The NYSBA has memorandums of understanding with the Seoul Bar Association and the Dai-Ichi Bar Association of Tokyo. Hank Greenberg, the association's president and a shareholder at Greenberg Traurig in Albany, announced the agreements in January 2020. New York's version of the Model Rules was created by adjusting the standard Model Rules to reflect indigenous New York rules that had been incorporated over the years into its version of the Model Code. Even though New York did not adopt the Model Rules verbatim, the advantage of adopting its overall structure is that it simplifies the professional responsibility training of New York lawyers, and makes it easier for out-of-state lawyers to conform their conduct to New York rules by simply comparing their home state's version of the Model Rules to New York's version.

The New York State Bar has sought legislation to simplify and update court procedures; advocates to raise judicial standards and to enhance voluntary pro bono cases; established systems for maintaining the integrity of the profession; and provides public education and legal services to the indigent. Today, NYSBA includes over 74,000 members, of whom 18,000 reside out of state.

In 2026, Taa Grays became the 129th president of the NYSBA and the first African-American woman to do so.

== Structure ==
The control and administration of the NYSBA is vested in the House of Delegates, the decision and policy-making body of the association. The house meets four times a year (January, April, June and November). Action taken by the House of Delegates on specific issues becomes official NYSBA policy.

The state bar's current structure includes 28 specialized substantive law sections, and more than 60 standing, special, and other committees.

== New York Professional Responsibility Rules ==
On July 8, 2020, the NYSBA issued an ethics opinion authorizing New York lawyers to advise clients regarding compliance with New York's recreational marijuana law. The opinion also authorized New York lawyers to use marijuana for recreational purposes.

== See also ==
- New York City Bar Association
- State bar association
