= Descôteaux v Mierzwinski =

Descôteaux et al v Mierzwinski
- Supreme Court of Canada

Hearing: 27–28 October 1981 Judgment: 23 June 1982
- Full case name: Simon Descôteaux and Centre communautaire juridique de Montréal v Alexandre Mierzwinski
- Citations: [1982] 1 SCR 860
- Docket No.: 16113
- Prior history: APPEAL from Descôteaux v Mierzwinski, [1980] 16 CR (3d) 188 (Quebec Court of Appeal), affirming Descôteaux v Mierzwinski, [1978] Que SC 792 (Quebec Superior Court)
- Ruling: Appeal dismissed

Court membership
- Chief Justice: Bora Laskin; Puisne Justices: Ronald Martland, Roland Ritchie, Brian Dickson, Jean Beetz, Willard Estey, William McIntyre, Julien Chouinard, Antonio Lamer

Reasons given
- Unanimous reasons by: Lamer J
- Laskin CJ and McIntyre J took no part in the consideration or decision of the case.

Descôteaux v Mierzwinski, [1982] 1 SCR 860 is a leading Supreme Court of Canada decision on solicitor-client privilege. The court reaffirmed the opinion in R. v. Solosky that privilege was a substantive right that even existed outside of a proceeding.

== Background ==
The police were investigating the legal aid bureau in Montreal in relation to a charge on Marcellein Ledoux for falsely stating his financial status in order to qualify for the services. The police had a search warrant seize the records from the legal aid interview with Ledoux and the legal aid application he filled out. The clinic appealed the seizure on the basis that the documents were protected by solicitor-client privilege.

== Opinion of the court ==
Justice Lamer, writing for a unanimous court, held that the documents were not wrongly seized. The trial court erred when dismissing the motion for certiorari to quash the warrant, but not because the documents were privileged.

The Superior Court had refused to quash the warrant on the basis that the documents could not benefit from solicitor-client privilege, as they were communicated before any solicitor-client relationship was formalized. This was not in accordance with the case law, as any information communicated with the intent of obtaining legal advice falls within the scope of solicitor-client privilege, even if the lawyer is not retained and legal advice is never given.

However, the legal aid application falls within one of the exceptions to solicitor-client privilege, known as the crime-fraud exception: any communication made for the purpose of obtaining legal advice to facilitate the commission of a crime, or any communication which itself is the material element of a crime, does not benefit from the principle of privilege.

The Court formulates the 4-point substantive rule of the privilege, which it states was put forth in Solosky, but was not formulated explicitly.

Lamer described the privilege as:

all information which a person must provide in order to obtain legal advice and which is given in confidence for that purpose enjoys the privileges attaching to confidentiality. This confidentiality attaches to all communications made within the framework of the solicitor-client relationship

He stated that where a law interferes with the right to privilege then the privilege must prevail except for where it is absolutely necessary in order to achieve the purpose of the enabling legislation.
