= Public-interest privilege =

Under common law, public-interest privilege prevents the compulsory disclosure of documents or information which is against the public interest. There is a balance between public interests- if the public interest in secrecy is greater than the public interest in disclosure, it will be privileged. The public interest in disclosure is the principle that a court of justice ought not be denied access to relevant information, and that the opposing party should have access to all relevant information to make their case.

Unlike other privileges, this right is not vested in any party or entity. The court may, of its own motion, prevent admission of evidence if it thinks it may disclose privileged information. The government need not be a party to proceedings for privilege to be raised. Privilege, being vested in the public interest and not a party, cannot be waived by a party. However, if the information has been published elsewhere this is a very strong factor towards the public interest of disclosure.

This privilege may be claimed on two bases. Firstly, that the documents belong to a class of documents which the public interest requires should not be disclosed. In Australia, even for documents belonging to a very high level documents, such as cabinet papers, the court must interrogate whether it really is prejudicial to the public interest to disclose it. Australian judges in general have been more willing to disclose information than judges in England or Canada.

When people seek to protect their narrow and private interests, it is called private-interest privilege.

== See also ==
- Privilege in general
- State Secrets Privilege, the United States equivalent
