= Hickman v. Taylor =

1947 United States Supreme Court case

- Supreme Court of the United States

Argued November 13, 1946 Decided January 13, 1947
- Full case name: Hickman, Administrator v. Taylor, et al., trading as Taylor & Anderson Towing & Lighterage Company, et al.
- Citations: 329 U.S. 495 (more) 67 S. Ct. 385; 91 L. Ed. 451; 1947 U.S. LEXIS 2966; 34 Ohio Op. 395

Case history
- Prior: Cert. to the Circuit Court of Appeals for the Third Circuit

Holding
- Discovery of written materials obtained or prepared by an adversary’s counsel with an eye toward litigation may not be had unless party seeking discovery can establish that relevant and non-privileged facts remain hidden in an attorney’s file and where production of those facts is essential to the preparation of one’s case.

Court membership
- Chief Justice Fred M. Vinson Associate Justices Hugo Black · Stanley F. Reed; Felix Frankfurter · William O. Douglas; Frank Murphy · Robert H. Jackson; Wiley B. Rutledge · Harold H. Burton

Case opinions
- Majority: Murphy, joined by Vinson, Black, Reed, Douglas, Rutledge, Burton
- Concurrence: Jackson, joined by Frankfurter

Laws applied
- Fed. R. Civ. Pro. 26

Hickman v. Taylor, 329 U.S. 495 (1947), is a seminal United States Supreme Court case in which the Court recognized the work-product doctrine, which holds that information obtained or produced by or for attorneys in anticipation of litigation may be protected from discovery under the Federal Rules of Civil Procedure. The Court's decision in the case was unanimous.

== Parties ==
Plaintiff/Petitioner
Hickman, representative of one of five deceased employees on the John M. Taylor tugboat, owned and operated by Defendant.
Abraham E. Freedman, attorney for Petitioner.
Defendant
Taylor & Anderson Towing & Lighterage Co., et al., company owning tugboat in question.
Respondent
William I. Radner, of Washington, D.C., and Samuel B. Fortenbaugh, Jr., of Philadelphia, Pa., for the defendants.

== Background ==
=== State of law ===
Federal Rule of Civil Procedure 26, a relatively recent innovation at the time this case was originally filed, granted mandatory discovery of certain documents and materials when requested. (The modern Rule 26(b)(3), protecting trial preparation materials, did not become effective until 1970.)

=== Facts of case ===
On February 7, 1943, the tug 'J. M. Taylor' sank while engaged in helping to tow a car float of the Baltimore & Ohio Railroad across the Delaware River at Philadelphia. The cause of the accident was unknown. Five of the nine crew members were drowned. Three days later, the tug owners and the underwriters employed a law firm, of which respondend Fortenbaugh is a member, to defend them against potential suits by representatives of the deceased crew members and to sue the railroad for damages to the tug.

=== Prior history ===
A public hearing was held on March 4, 1943, before the United States Steamboat Inspectors, at which the four survivors were examined. This testimony was recorded and made available to all interested parties. Shortly thereafter, Fortenbaugh privately interviewed the survivors and took statements from them with an eye toward the anticipated litigation; the survivors signed these statements on March 29. Fortenbaugh also interviewed other persons believed to have some information relating to the accident, and in some cases he made memoranda of what they told him. At the time when Fortenbaugh secured the statements of the survivors, representatives of two of the deceased crew members had been in communication with him. Ultimately, claims were presented by representatives of all five of the deceased; four of the claims, however, were settled without litigation. The fifth claimant, petitioner herein, brought suit in a federal court under the Jones Act on November 26, 1943, naming as defendants the two tug owners, individually and as partners, and the railroad. Petitioner sought to compel production of signed statements and memoranda. Respondent granted names of those who had provided statements, but refused to produce documents. The court ordered his imprisonment, but stayed the order pending appeal. Respondent appealed to the Court of Appeals for the Third Circuit, and the production order was reversed.

=== Procedural posture ===
Petitioner seeks reinstatement of order to produce documents and order of imprisonment.

== Legal analysis ==
The issue in this case was whether the district court erred in requiring the production of documents obtained or prepared by retained counsel in anticipation of litigation, absent necessity or other circumstances. The respondent refused to produce documents on the ground that they were not subject to discovery, and were protected as privileged matter obtained in preparation for litigation. Respondent argued that the interrogatory constituted "an attempt to obtain indirectly counsel's private files" and therefore production of documents would amount to revealing the litigation strategy of counsel. Petitioner countered that the deposition-discovery provisions of the Federal Rules of Civil Procedure were designed to enable the parties to discover true facts and compel their disclosure wherever they may be found. Because discovery is to be granted liberally, the privilege limitation must be interpreted narrowly, as prohibiting discovery in these circumstances would aid corporate defendants against individual plaintiffs by allowing corporate defendants to retain a lawyer immediately, making all subsequently collected information unavailable to plaintiff. Individuals, on the other hand, might have to wait for some time before retaining a lawyer, making information collected before the retention of counsel available to the corporate defendant.

=== Discussion ===
According to the American work-product doctrine, discovery of written materials obtained or prepared by an adversary's counsel with an eye toward litigation may not be had unless party seeking discovery can establish that relevant and non-privileged facts remain hidden in an attorney's file and where production of those facts is essential to the preparation of one's case. In light of this, the district court erred in requiring the production of documents obtained or prepared by retained counsel in anticipation of litigation absent necessity or other circumstances.

Petitioner's argument that protection of trial preparation materials unduly benefits corporate defendants against individual plaintiffs is not persuasive, as discovery may work to the disadvantage as well as to the advantage of individual plaintiffs. While discovery should be granted liberally, there are limits, such as a prohibition on discovery of bad faith discovery requests or attempts to obtain privileged material. Furthermore, defendant's argument that such material is protected by attorney–client privilege is faulty because statements, memoranda, and mental impressions do not fall under such privilege because those materials do not document interaction with the client. Petitioner having been granted the list of those interviewed has full ability to consult those individuals itself or to consult the public records available on the subject. Petitioner had not showed any prejudicial effect of denying discovery. It is essential that counsel who historically are officers of the court be able to work with a certain degree of privacy, free from unnecessary intrusion by opposing parties and their counsel.

Consequently, the "work product" of the attorney inevitably reflects the mental impressions of the attorney such that if discovery were granted much less would be written and much more would be forgotten consequently leading to inefficiency, unfairness, and sharp practices which would inevitably develop in the giving of legal advice in turn damaging the legal profession and the interests of justice and discovery. In cases of necessity, turning over this information may be permissible when information is embedded in the attorney work product but only when alternate methods of acquiring the method are unavailable. Whereas in this case, there is no showing of necessity or unavailability of the information elsewhere.

=== Notable concurring and dissenting opinions ===
Jackson, J., concurring.
Discovery rules may not be formulated in granting special privileges to one class of litigants, plaintiff or defendant, corporate or individual, or otherwise. Discovery is intended to afford fairness in access to information, not to make one's litigation strategy available to one's adversary. While a "battle of wits" results from confidential litigation strategies, litigation without strategy would be far more demeaning to the legal profession and would not work in the interest of justice.

== Result ==
=== Judgment/disposition ===
Circuit court reversal of production order affirmed.

=== Legacy and other notes ===
The "trial preparations material"/work-product doctrine was later codified in Federal Rule of Civil Procedure 26(b)(3). See Rule 26.

== See also ==
- List of United States Supreme Court cases, volume 329
