= Adverse party =

An adverse party is an opposing party in a lawsuit under an adversary system of law. In general, an adverse party is a party against whom judgment is sought or "a party interested in sustaining a judgment or decree." For example, the adverse party for a defendant is the plaintiff.

== Adverse party's witnesses ==
A witness called on behalf of an adverse party is usually an adverse witness. In general, the examination of an adverse party's witness may include leading questions and follows the rules of cross examination.

== See also ==
- Adverse
- Adverse possession
- Hostile witness
