= Privilege (evidence) =

Legal right or duty to refuse disclosure of evidence

In the law of evidence, a privilege is a rule of evidence that allows the holder of the privilege to refuse to disclose information or provide evidence about a certain subject or to bar such evidence from being disclosed or used in a judicial or other proceeding.

There are many such privileges recognised by the judicial system, some stemming from the common law and others from statute law. Each privilege has its own rules, which often vary between jurisdictions.

== Types ==
One well-known privilege is the solicitor–client privilege, referred to as the attorney–client privilege in the United States and as the legal professional privilege in Australia. This protects confidential communications between a client and his or her legal adviser for the dominant purpose of legal advice. The rationale is that clients ought to be able to communicate freely with their lawyers, in order to facilitate the proper functioning of the legal system.

Other common forms include privilege against compelled self-incrimination (in other proceedings), without prejudice privilege (protecting communications made in the course of negotiations to settle a legal dispute), public interest privilege (formerly Crown privilege, protecting documents for which secrecy is necessary for the proper functioning of government), spousal (marital) privilege, medical professional privilege, and clergy–penitent privilege.

In the US, several states have enacted the Uniform Mediation Act (UMA) which specifies a mediator's privilege with regard to state procedures. In the UK, "mediation privilege" is generally protected, although in the case of Ruttle Plant Hire v DEFRA (2007), an action brought to seek to set aside a settlement agreement on the grounds that it was entered into under economic duress, there was a call for the mediator to give evidence on her recollection of the mediation process.

In the United Kingdom, the Rehabilitation of Offenders Act 1974 provides that evidence relating to spent convictions (those in respect of which the Act says the convicted person is rehabilitated, generally older and less serious ones) is inadmissible and provides privilege against answering questions relating to such convictions; although some exceptions apply, in particular in criminal proceedings.

== Effect ==
The effect of the privilege is usually a right on the part of a party or witness to a case, allowing them to refuse to produce evidence in the form of documents or testimony from the person entitled to the privilege. For example, a person can generally prevent their attorney from testifying about the legal relationship between attorney and client, even if the attorney were willing to do so. In this case, the privilege belongs to the client and not the attorney.

In a few instances, such as the marital privilege, the privilege is a right held by the potential witness. Thus, if a wife wishes to testify against her husband, she may do so even if he opposes this testimony; however, the wife has the privilege of refusing to testify even if the husband wishes her to do so.

On the other hand, the person entitled to a privilege is at liberty to waive the privilege.

== Examples of privileged information ==
- Accountant–client privilege
- Attorney–client privilege
- Banker–client privilege
- Priest–penitent privilege
- Physician-patient privilege
- Psychotherapist–patient privilege
- Reporter's privilege
- State secrets privilege
  - Classified Information Procedures Act

== See also ==
- Admissible evidence
- Deliberative process privilege
- Privilege log
- Public-interest immunity
- Reporters' privilege
- Right to silence
- Silent witness rule
- Subpoena duces tecum
