= American Bar Association Model Code of Professional Responsibility =

Set of professional standards for lawyers in the United States

The American Bar Association Model Code of Professional Responsibility, created by the American Bar Association (ABA) in 1969, was a set of professional standards designed to establish the minimum baseline of legal ethics and professional responsibility generally required of lawyers in the United States.

It was replaced with the Model Rules of Professional Conduct in 1983 for a number of reasons, especially the Watergate scandal. The Code was also subject to widespread criticism from bench and bar that it was structurally flawed, difficult to understand, hard to obey, and impossible to enforce. The Code consisted of Canons, Ethical Considerations, and Disciplinary Rules, of which the first two were aspirational and only the third was mandatory. This forced judges and lawyers to sort through a maze of Canons and Ethical Considerations just to understand the Disciplinary Rule that controlled a particular ethical issue. During a key debate in late January 1982 over whether to replace the Model Code with the Model Rules, one delegate "referred to the nine canons, 129 ethical considerations and forty-three disciplinary rules as a three-dimensional chess game that lawyers played at their own peril." The American legal community demanded simple bright-line rules that its members could quickly read, comprehend, and follow. In response, the Model Rules consists simply of Rules.

According to the Code's Preface, it was derived from the ABA's Canons of Professional Ethics (1908), which in turn were borrowed from the Canons of the Alabama State Bar (1887), which in turn were inspired by several sources such as ethics resolutions in an 1830s legal textbook.

The U.S. state of New York was the last state using the Code for many years, long after all other states–except California and Maine–had adopted the Model Rules. On December 17, 2008, the administrative committee of the New York courts announced that it had adopted a heavily modified version of the Model Rules, effective April 1, 2009. New York's version of the Model Rules was created by adjusting the standard Model Rules to reflect indigenous New York rules that had been incorporated over the years into its version of the Model Code. Even though New York did not adopt the Model Rules verbatim, the advantage of adopting its overall structure is that it simplifies the professional responsibility training of New York lawyers, and makes it easier for out-of-state lawyers to conform their conduct to New York rules by simply comparing their home state's version of the Model Rules to New York's version.
