= Solosky v R =

- Supreme Court of Canada

Hearing: June 13, 1979 Judgment: December 21, 1979
- Full case name: Billy Solosky v Her Majesty The Queen
- Citations: [1980] 1 S.C.R. 821
- Ruling: The appeal by Solosky was dismissed.

Court membership
- Chief Justice: Bora Laskin; Puisne Justices: Ronald Martland, Roland Ritchie, Louis-Philippe Pigeon, Brian Dickson, Jean Beetz, Willard Estey, William McIntyre, Julien Chouinard

Reasons given
- Majority: Dickson J., joined by Laskin C.J. and Martland, Ritchie, Pigeon, Beetz, Pratte and McIntyre JJ.
- Concurrence: Estey J.

Solosky v R (1979), [1980] 1 S.C.R. 821 is a leading Supreme Court of Canada decision on solicitor-client privilege. The court identified solicitor-client privilege as more than just a rule of evidence but as a fundamental right to all individuals.

== Background ==
Billy Solosky was an inmate at the Millhaven corrections institute. All mail was subject to screening by officers of the prison under the Penitentiary Act. Solosky sought an application to prevent the screening of correspondence with his lawyer under solicitor-client privilege.

== Reasons of the court ==
Justice Dickson, writing for the majority, held that Solosky had a right to privilege in all of his correspondence between him and his lawyer. Though privilege has its origins as an evidentiary rule to protect parties in a litigation, it has become available to all clients seeking legal advice.

The criteria to gain the protection of solicitor-client privilege requires "(i) a communication between solicitor and client; (ii) which entails the seeking or giving of legal advice; and (iii) which is intended to be confidential by the parties" (p. 834)

Dickson, however, stated that privilege did not apply where legal advice is not sought or offered, where it is not intended to be confidential, and where its purpose is to further unlawful conduct. (p. 835)

== See also ==
- List of Supreme Court of Canada cases (Laskin Court)
