= American Bar Association Model Rules of Professional Conduct =

Professional ethics rules

The American Bar Association's Model Rules of Professional Conduct (MRPC) are a set of rules and commentaries on the ethical and professional responsibilities of members of the legal profession in the United States. Although the MRPC generally is not binding law in and of itself, it is intended to be a model for state regulators of the legal profession (such as bar associations) to adopt, while leaving room for state-specific adaptations. All fifty states and the District of Columbia have adopted legal ethics rules based at least in part on the MRPC.

In almost all U.S. jurisdictions, prospective attorneys seeking admission to a state bar are typically required to demonstrate knowledge of the MRPC by achieving a sufficiently high score on the Multistate Professional Responsibility Examination.

== Organization ==
The MRPC is organized into eight major categories of rules (numbered 1 through 8), each of which contains up to 18 individual rules within, numbered using a decimal point to denote the hierarchy and organization of rules.

The 8 major categories of rules are as follows:

Number	Name	Notable Rules
1	Client-Lawyer Relationship	1.1: Duty of Competence; 1.6: Confidentiality of client information. Note that these confidentiality requirements overlap with but are distinct from evidentiary rules of attorney-client privilege.; 1.7-1.11: Conflicts of Interest, including restrictions on attorneys arising from current clients, former clients, prior work as a government employee or judge, and association with law firms.
2	Counselor	2.1: Attorney's role as a candid advisor on topics within and outside of the law.
3	Advocate	3.3: Duty of Candor in communications with a court.; 3.4: Responsibility for cooperation and fair dealing with other parties and attorneys.; 3.8: Special Responsibilities of a Prosecutor.
4	Transactions with Persons Other Than Clients	4.2: No-Contact Rule; if a person has an attorney, other attorneys should not communicate directly with that person.
5	Law Firms and Associations	5.5: Unauthorized Practice of Law: Attorneys cannot practice law without being properly admitted or otherwise authorized to practice within a given jurisdiction.
6	Public Service	6.1: Pro Bono Service: Lawyers should endeavor to provide a certain amount of legal services free of charge to persons, organizations, or causes in need of representation.
7	Information About Legal Services	7.3: Limitations on methods of soliciting clients and business.
8	Maintaining the Integrity of the Profession	8.3: Duty to report certain violations of legal ethics rules by a lawyer or judge.

In addition to the text of the rules, each rule is followed by a series of "Comments" which are not rules per se, but provide guidance to help attorneys interpret the rules.

== History ==
The MRPC is part of a series of attempts by the American legal profession to develop a centralized authority on legal ethics.

=== Predecessors ===
In 1908, the ABA's Committee on Code of Professional Ethics delivered the "Canons of Professional Ethics", which set forth general principles and responsibilities for members of the legal profession. The Canons drew heavily from the Alabama State Bar Association's 1887 Code of Ethics. At the time, the Committee suggested "that the subject of professional ethics be taught in all law schools, and that all candidates for admission to the Bar be examined thereon."

Lewis F. Powell, Jr., then-President of the ABA (and later an Associate Justice on the U.S. Supreme Court), in 1964 asked that a Special Committee be formed to review the Canons. While the Canons were still viewed as "sound in substance", they had come to be seen as disorganized, dated, and "not an effective teaching instrument" for lawyers. The result of this effort was the Model Code of Professional Responsibility, which took effect in 1970. Although differently organized, the Code was substantively similar to the Canons.

=== The Kutak Commission ===
The 1970s saw the Watergate scandal, which led to the resignation of President Richard M. Nixon. Attorneys were involved in Watergate in many ways, leading to concerns that "the self-governance of the profession" was imperiled.

Motivated in part by this concern, in 1977 the American Bar Association (ABA) formed the Kutak Commission (formally the Commission on Evaluation of Professional Standards) for the purpose of evaluating the adequacy of the existing ethics rules, including the Model Code of Professional Responsibility. Chaired by Robert J. Kutak, co-founder of the law firm Kutak Rock LLP, the Commission set out "to develop professional standards that are comprehensive, consistent, constitutional and, most important, congruent with other law of which they are a part."

Finding it infeasible to modernize the rules via a set of amendments to the existing Model Code, the Commission developed various drafts of a new set of rules, and collecting feedback from a wide range of stakeholders. It issued a Proposed Final Draft in May 1981, which the ABA House of Delegates discussed and debated over the course of the following two years. With some amendments, the House of Delegates adopted the new Model Rules of Professional Conduct at its August 1983 annual meeting.

In the course of the drafting process and debate, the Kutak Commission recommended, and the House of Delegates approved, that for ease of use the MRPC be set forth in a format akin to the American Law Institute's Restatements of the Law with numbered rules and supplemental comments discussing each rule. The Commission argued that this format would be familiar to lawyers and would clearly delineate the "black-letter Rules" from the helpful but nonbinding "interpretive guidance" in the comments.

=== Amendments ===
After the 1983 adoption of the MRPC, the ABA's Standing Committee on Ethics and Professional Responsibility has regularly reviewed the MRPC and proposed various amendments to the House of Delegates.

One major overhaul began in 1997, when the ABA formed the "Ethics 2000 Commission" to review the MRPC in its entirety. This review was prompted by increasing levels of variation in states' implementations of the MRPC as well as the impact of technological developments and other changes in the modern practice of law. The Ethics 2000 Commission proposed various amendments to the MRPC, covering topics such as attorneys' communications with clients and third parties, confidentiality, conflicts of interest, issues specific to law firms, pro bono service, and obligations to the court. The House of Delegates further amended and then adopted many of the Commission's proposals.

As of March 2020, the most recent amendment to the MRPC was in August 2018, when the House of Delegates approved changes to Model Rule 7 concerning attorney advertising and client solicitation.

== State adoption ==
Because the MRPC does not itself have the force of law, it relies on regulators at the state level to adopt it in full or in part, potentially with state-specific modifications.

By the end of 2009, 49 states and the District of Columbia had adopted the MRPC in some form. California remained an outlier until November 2018, when new ethics rules modeled after the MRPC went into effect.

=== Variation across states ===
The ABA maintains detailed tables of each state's version of each Model Rule, allowing for direct comparisons across jurisdictions. Some straightforward rules, such as the Rule 2.1 requirement that "a lawyer shall exercise independent professional judgment and render candid advice," are adopted without modification by the vast majority of jurisdictions. On the other hand, some of the more detailed rules, such as Rule 1.15 governing attorneys' handling of client property, are the subject of extensive modifications in nearly all states. The ABA also provides, for each state, links to that state's full rules of professional conduct as well as ethics opinions rendered by the state's governing authority.

=== California ===
Until recently, California had not adopted the MRPC. California's recent changes to largely adopt the MRPC came out of a lengthy effort to overhaul the state's ethics rules.

Noting that the last overhaul of the California ethics rules was in 1992, in the early 2000s the State Bar of California formed a Commission for the Revision of the Rules of Professional Conduct tasked with considering intervening changes in the law and the findings of the ABA's Ethics 2000 Commission. The new Commission's goals included reducing ambiguities, protecting the public and the integrity of the legal profession, and avoiding "unnecessary differences between California and other states." The Commission eventually proposed rules revisions to the state Supreme Court in 2012, but the Court responded with a request that the State Bar form a second Commission to further evaluate the rules.

That second Commission convened in 2014, with a goal of submitting new rules to the Supreme Court by March 2017. The new Commission's goals were similar to those of the first, but noted that in some cases the MRPC could be a guide in the quest to reduce differences between California and other states. The State Bar ultimately submitted its new proposal to the California Supreme Court on March 30, 2017.

On May 10, 2018, the Supreme Court of California entered an administrative order on the 70 proposed rules which approved 27 rules in full, approved 42 rules with modifications, and rejected only one rule. The rules took effect on November 1, 2018.

The new California rules are numbered so as to closely map to their MRPC analogues.

== Use by Tribunals ==
Although the MRPC does not have binding effect on its own, some courts and administrative agencies that are not confined to a single state refer to or explicitly follow the MRPC in their opinions, court rules, or regulations.

=== Federal Courts ===
==== Citation ====
The U.S. Supreme Court occasionally mentions the MRPC when considering cases that involve attorney conduct in some way. For example, in 1986, the Court in Nix v. Whiteside cited several of the Rules to support the general proposition that an attorney must not assist a client in "conduct that the lawyer knows to be illegal or fraudulent," and furthermore must take steps to prevent clients from offering false testimony to a court.

==== Incorporation into court rules ====
Some federal courts that operate in multiple states explicitly adopt some or all of the MRPC either for attorney conduct in general or for certain specific purposes. These courts include:

Court	Application of MRPC
United States Court of Appeals for the Second Circuit	Requires law students appearing before the court to certify in writing their familiarity and intent to comply with the MRPC.
United States Court of Appeals for the Sixth Circuit	Provides that the court may discipline attorneys who violate the MRPC.
United States Court of Appeals for the Seventh Circuit	Demands conformity with MRPC of attorneys appointed by a district court as counsel for defendants unable to afford representation under the Criminal Justice Act of 1964.
United States Court of Appeals for the Eleventh Circuit	Attorneys are subject to multiple sets of rules including the MRPC.
United States Court of Appeals for the Armed Forces	Adopts the MRPC "as the rules of conduct for members of the Bar of this Court."
United States Court of Appeals for Veterans Claims	Adopts the MRPC as the "disciplinary standard for practice".
United States Court of Federal Claims	Requires law students appearing before the court to "have knowledge of" the MRPC.
United States Tax Court	Requires attorneys to operate "in accordance with the letter and spirit" of the MRPC. Uses MRPC Rules 1.7, 1.8, and 3.7 to define and address attorney conflict of interest situations.

Some other federal courts of appeals do not use the MRPC, but instead defer to state rules of professional conduct. For example, the Fourth Circuit subjects attorneys to discipline for violations of "the rules of professional conduct or responsibility in effect in the state or other jurisdiction in which the attorney maintains his or her principal office." The First Circuit does the same, but also holds attorneys to the rules of conduct for the state "in which the attorney is acting at the time of the misconduct" as well as the rules of the state of the court clerk's office.

Because federal district courts sit within a single state, many use the professional conduct rules of that state.

=== Administrative agencies ===
A small number of federal administrative agencies incorporate the MRPC into their rules of practice and procedure. For example, the Federal Maritime Commission requires attorneys practicing before it to conform to the MRPC. The Occupational Safety and Health Review Commission demands not only that attorneys comply with the "letter and spirit" of the MRPC, but that its judges do as well. And attorneys representing veterans pursuing claims for benefits are subject to standards of conduct "consistent with" the MRPC.

== See also ==
- Admission to practice law
- American Bar Association
- Legal ethics
- Professional responsibility
- State bar association
