= Spousal privilege =

Common law rule of evidence

In common law, spousal privilege (also called marital privilege or husband-wife privilege) is a term used in the law of evidence to describe two separate privileges that apply to spouses: the spousal communications privilege and the spousal testimonial privilege.

Both types of privilege are based on the policy of encouraging spousal harmony and preventing spouses from condemning, or being condemned by, their spouses: the spousal communications privilege or confidences privilege is a form of privileged communication that protects the contents of confidential communications between spouses during their marriage from testimonial disclosure, while spousal testimonial privilege (also called spousal incompetency and spousal immunity) protects the individual holding the privilege from being called to testify in proceedings relating to their spouse. However, in some countries, the spousal privileges have their roots in the legal fiction that a husband and wife were one person.

== Around the world ==
=== United States ===
In the United States, federal case law dictates the privileges permissible and prohibited in federal trials, while state case law governs their scope in state courts. A common rule for both the communications privilege and the testimonial privilege is that, "absent a lawful marriage, civil union, or domestic partnership, there is no privilege." Both rules may be suspended depending on the jurisdiction in the case of divorce proceedings or child custody disputes, but are suspended in cases where one spouse is accused of a crime against the other spouse or the spouse's child. Courts generally do not permit an adverse spouse to invoke either privilege during a trial initiated by the other spouse, or in the case of domestic abuse. The privileges may also be suspended where both spouses are joint participants in a crime, depending on the law of the jurisdiction.

==== Communications privilege ====
In all federal and state courts, a spousal communications privilege applies in both civil and criminal cases. It is far less controversial than the testimonial privilege as it does not originate from the legal fiction that a husband and wife were one person. Instead, it is rooted in the idea that those who are married should feel safe openly communicating with each other without fear of future litigation or criminal proceedings.

In most jurisdictions including in federal courts, both the witness-spouse and the accused-spouse have the spousal communications privilege, so either may invoke it to prevent the witness-spouse from testifying about a confidential communication made during the marriage even if neither spouse is a party in the trial. It covers all communications made during marriage, and cannot be invoked to protect confidential communications between currently married spouses which occurred prior to their marriage. Unlike testimonial privilege, the communications privilege survives the end of a marriage, and may be asserted by a spouse to protect confidential communications that were made during the marriage—even after divorce or death.

The spousal communications privilege may not be invoked if the spouses are suing each other or each other's estates in a civil case; nor if one of the spouses has initiated a criminal proceeding against the other; nor in a competency proceeding regarding one of the spouses. These three scenarios are identical to the limitations which also apply to limit the spousal testimonial privilege. Two further scenarios defeat the spousal communications privilege: if the confidential communication was made in order to plan or commit a crime or fraud, or if a defendant-spouse wishes, in a criminal trial, to testify in their own defense, about a confidential marital communication. In these five situations, a court will not allow either spouse to assert the privilege to block the testimony.

The privilege may not be invoked if the statements were not intended to be confidential. Statements are not confidential if they were made in front of a third party or with the expectation that they would be shared with others. However, the presence of a young child does not negate the confidentiality of the communication. The opposing party must rebut the presumption that confidentiality was intended.

==== Testimonial privilege ====
Under U.S. federal common law, the spousal testimonial privilege is held by the witness-spouse, not the party-spouse, and therefore does not prevent a spouse who wishes to testify from doing so. The rationale of this rule is that if a witness-spouse desires to testify against the party-spouse, there is no marital harmony left to protect through the obstruction of such testimony. This common law principle is the view in a minority of U.S. states. A majority of U.S. jurisdictions, however, do not follow U.S. federal common law; in most states, the party-spouse, and not the witness-spouse, is the holder of spousal testimonial privilege.

Spousal testimonial privilege covers observations, such as the color of the clothing the party-spouse was wearing on a certain day, as well as communications, such as the content of a telephone conversation with the party-spouse.

The holder of the privilege may invoke it regarding events which occurred (1) during the marriage, if the spouses are still married; and (2) prior to the marriage if they are married to their spouse in court proceedings at the time of trial. If, by the time the trial occurs, the spouses are no longer married, the privilege holder may testify freely about any events which occurred prior to, after, or even during the marriage. Spousal testimonial privilege may not be invoked if the spouses are suing each other or each other's estates in a civil case; if one of the spouses has initiated a criminal proceeding against the other; or in a competency proceeding regarding one of the spouses. Spousal testimonial privilege, in other words, only lasts as long as the marriage does.

A minority of states apply testimonial privilege in both criminal and civil cases. For example, under California Evidence Code ("CEC") §970, California permits the application of testimonial privilege to both civil and criminal cases, and includes both the privilege not to testify as well as the privilege not to be called as a witness by the party adverse to the interests of the spouse in the trial.

=== England and Wales ===
==== Testimonial privilege ====
This privilege is one aspect of a long-established rule of evidence, in its origin a common law rule, that a party to legal proceedings shall not be required to testify against himself. Deriving from the legal fiction that a husband and wife are one person, it extends the defendant's protection against self-incrimination to his wife also.

At common law, accordingly, prior to 1853 the wife of a party in a case was not competent to give evidence for or against him (so could not do so even voluntarily).

In civil cases, the common law rule was abolished by the Evidence Amendment Act 1853, section 1 of which provided that one spouse was generally competent to give evidence against the other (i.e. in a civil suit could do so voluntarily) and could be compelled to do so (i.e. by the other party, not being the other spouse). This was extended by the Evidence Further Amendment Act 1869 to proceedings actually brought by the other spouse, in consequence of adultery (i.e. relating to the marriage), the position on compulsion being clarified in Tilley v Tilley (1949).

In criminal cases, however, the common law long held that wives were not competent to give evidence against their husband (i.e. for the prosecution), subject to the one exception that a wife could give such evidence where her husband was accused of personal violence against her.

Section 4(1) of the Criminal Evidence Act 1898 made spouses competent to give evidence against one another in many more circumstances, including giving evidence for the defence. It was initially assumed that the Act also meant spouses could be compelled to give such evidence, but the House of Lords ruled otherwise in Leach v R (1912).

Distinguishing Leach, the Court of Criminal Appeal held in R v Lapworth (1930) that a wife was nevertheless a compellable witness for the prosecution in cases of personal violence against her, on the basis that the common law position prior to the 1898 Act had not been affected by the Act. However, in Hoskyn v Metropolitan Police Commissioner (1978) the House of Lords overruled Lapworth, ending the personal violence exception, ruling that spouses are competent but not compellable witnesses for the prosecution in all cases, thus restoring the 1912 decision in Leach. In reaching this view, judges were swayed by the special status of marriage, and the "natural repugnance" that the public would feel at seeing a wife give evidence against her husband in a wide range of scenarios.

This absolute immunity lasted only until the entry into force of section 80 of the Police and Criminal Evidence Act 1984, which restored in limited cases the ability of the prosecution to compel the testimony of the spouse of the accused (later amended to include civil partners), namely where the defendant has been charged with "assault on, or injury or a threat of injury to" the spouse or a child under 16, or a sexual offence toward a child under 16. In addition, under the 1984 Act, the defence can almost always compel the spouse to testify, and as set out in section 53 of the Youth Justice and Criminal Evidence Act 1999 a spouse will generally be competent to offer testimony voluntarily. However, a spouse (or civil partner) who is an active co-defendant to the charge can only testify for the defence (and cannot be compelled to do so by either side), part of her own right to the privilege against self-incrimination. No privilege extends to couples who are co-habiting but are neither married nor in a civil partnership, a source of major criticism.

The 1984 Act also repealed section 43(1) of the Matrimonial Causes Act 1965, in a further extension of the wife's protection from violence directed against her (which had protected the husband from the wife giving evidence on a charge of marital rape).

It may be prudent to be cautious about seeking to compel a spouse to give evidence against her will, as it may tend to bring the law into disrepute. According to the Crown Prosecution Service, it is questionable whether she will tell the truth under those circumstances, and she may become a hostile witness, circumstances which must tend to reduce the credibility of her evidence.

==== Communications privilege ====
This form of privilege, restricting the admissibility into evidence of communications between spouses during a marriage, existed in English law from 1853 until it was abolished in 1968 (for civil cases) and in 1984 (for criminal cases).

The existence of a communications privilege in the common law (i.e. in case law) is disputed. Its existence was assumed by late nineteenth century writers, but in 1939 Sir Wilfred Greene, MR, noted in the Court of Appeal in Shenton v Tyler that having researched the subject he found no evidence to support this view and that, rather, any such privilege was solely the result of statute.

In particular Sir Wilfred cited, as the sole origin of the privilege, section 3 of the Evidence Amendment Act 1853 which provided that, in civil cases, "no husband shall be compellable to disclose any communication made to him by his wife during the marriage, and no wife shall be compellable to disclose any communication made to her by her husband during the marriage". This provision was based on the Second Report of the Commissioners on Common Law Procedure, who referenced the "inviolability of domestic confidence". It was repeated in section 1 of the Criminal Evidence Act 1898, which extended its applicability to the criminal law.

The provision made in the 1853 Act was limited – it did not extend to third-party disclosure, nor prevent voluntary disclosure – and was asymmetric, as it did not prevent the utterer from being compelled to disclose communications, only the listener (i.e. it acted only as a modified form of the rule against hearsay). As a result, in the Report on Privilege in Civil Proceedings published in December 1967 (partly influenced by the reasoning in Shenton v Tyler, where the Court of Appeal had refused to apply it) the English Law Reform Committee recommended its abolition in civil cases, which was done in the Civil Evidence Act 1968, and in criminal cases, which was eventually done in the Police and Criminal Evidence Act 1984.

=== Ireland ===
Generally, spouses cannot be compelled to give evidence against their partners as it forces them to choose between giving truthful evidence - thereby jeopardising their relationship - and giving unreliable evidence.

A 2019 Court of Appeal ruling found the protection to not testify against one's spouse extends only to married couples and not civil partnerships or other forms of relationships.

=== Scotland ===
As of the Criminal Justice and Licensing (Scotland) Act 2010 spouses and civil partners are compellable witnesses.

=== Australia ===
In Australian law, both the common law privilege of confidentiality between married people and the privilege of spouses not to testify against each other were assumed to have continued with the "reception" of English law.

On 30 November 2011, the High Court of Australia decided that neither privilege existed in common law – seemingly influenced (in regard to marital communications) by the English decision to that effect in 1939 in the case of Shenton v Tyler, and (in regard to privilege against testimony) the fact that by 1898 the old common law rule had been abolished in English law (i.e. whilst Australia was still a set of British colonies).

For legal purposes, the colonies of New South Wales and Van Diemen's Land had formally adopted English common law in 1828, and each of the other Australian colonies adopted the common law of New South Wales upon their founding.

However, a form of spousal privilege in criminal trials was for a long time preserved in Australian statute law, by the Evidence Acts.

== See also ==
- Edmunds–Tucker Act – an 1887 U.S. law that denied spousal privilege to polygamists
