= Work-product doctrine =

Aspect of US legal privilege

In American civil procedure, the work-product doctrine protects materials prepared in anticipation of litigation from discovery by opposing counsel. It is also known as the work-product rule, the work-product immunity, the work-product exception, and the work-product privilege, though there is debate about whether it is truly a "privilege." This doctrine does not apply in other countries, where such communications are not protected, but where the legal discovery process itself is much more limited.

== Doctrine ==
Under the work-product doctrine, "tangible material or its intangible equivalent" that is collected or prepared in anticipation of litigation is not discoverable.

=== Comparison with attorney–client privilege ===
The work-product doctrine is more inclusive than attorney–client privilege. Unlike the attorney–client privilege, which includes only communications between an attorney and the client, work product includes materials prepared by persons other than the attorney themselves: The materials may have been prepared by anybody as long as they were prepared with an eye towards the realistic possibility of impending litigation. Additionally, it includes materials collected for the attorney such as interrogatories, signed statements, other information acquired for the prosecution or defense of a case.

Despite its inclusiveness, the work-product doctrine is less powerful than the attorney-client privilege, and therefore may be overcome by a showing of necessity. An example of a possible exception would be a witness being unavailable due to death or living in a remote/hostile nation.

Even if an exception to the work-product doctrine is made, the court would still protect privileged actions by an attorney, by redacting the privileged part of the document. "Memoranda, briefs, communications ... other writings prepared by counsel for his/her own use in prosecuting the client's case ... mental impressions, conclusions, opinions, or legal theories" are never discoverable by an opposing party.

=== Assertion of the doctrine by pro se parties ===
There is considerable debate within the American federal judiciary system whether or not the protections afforded by the work-product doctrine may be asserted by a litigant who is not represented by an attorney or a litigant representing in pro se. No United States appellate court has yet decided the issue but multiple federal district courts and some state courts have held or assumed that unrepresented litigants do enjoy the protections of the doctrine.

== History ==
The work-product doctrine originated in the 1947 case of Hickman v. Taylor, in which the Supreme Court affirmed a United States Court of Appeals for the Third Circuit decision which excluded from discovery of oral and written statements made by witnesses to a defendant's attorney. The Supreme Court, acting at the recommendation of the Advisory Committee of the Judicial Conference, later enshrined this doctrine formally in the Federal Rules of Civil Procedure as Rule 26(b)(3).
