= Attorney–client privilege =

Confidentiality of communications with counsel

Attorney–client privilege or lawyer–client privilege is the common law doctrine of legal professional privilege in the United States. Attorney–client privilege is "[a] client's right to refuse to disclose and to prevent any other person from disclosing confidential communications between the client and the attorney."

The attorney–client privilege is one of the oldest privileges for confidential communications. The United States Supreme Court has stated that by assuring confidentiality, the privilege encourages clients to make "full and frank" disclosures to their attorneys, who are then better able to provide candid advice and effective representation.

== History ==
The origins of attorney–client privilege trace back to medieval England, where the king presided over trials and relied on attorneys to present cases. Because attorneys were considered officers of the court, they were expected to fully disclose all relevant information. However, as legal representation evolved, courts recognized that forcing attorneys to reveal client confidences undermined justice. This led to a principle that even the king could not compel an attorney to disclose privileged communications.

One of the earliest recorded cases affirming this privilege is Berd v. Lovelace (1577), where an English court ruled that legal counsel could not be forced to testify about client communications. By the 18th century, the principle had solidified in English common law, emphasizing that the privilege belonged to the client, not the attorney. This doctrine carried over to the American legal system, where it became a foundational rule of professional ethics. The U.S. Supreme Court has repeatedly affirmed its importance, notably in Upjohn Co. v. United States, 449 U.S. 383 (1981), which broadened the privilege to cover corporate legal communications.

== Kovel standard ==
With respect to experts that are hired by the attorneys, the attorney-client privilege is referred to as a Kovel standard based on the case of United States v. Kovel, 296 F.2d 918 (2d Cir. 1961) or broadly a Kovel Agreement. Experts hired by attorneys to assist in representation of a client may vary by profession. Such experts include (but are not limited to) CPAs, actuaries, medical doctors, or engineers. These experts may be disclosed or undisclosed to the court. In the United States disclosed expert witnesses may not be covered under the Kovel Standard, depending on the court and the nature of their work, and their involvement in the legal advice process.

== General requirements under United States law ==
Although there are minor variations, the elements necessary to establish the attorney–client privilege generally are:

1. The asserted holder of the privilege is (or sought to become) a client; and
2. The person to whom the communication was made:
  1. is a member of the bar of a court, or a subordinate of such a member, and
  2. in connection with this communication, is acting as an attorney; and
3. The communication was for the purpose of securing legal advice.

There are a number of exceptions to the privilege in most jurisdictions, chief among them:

1. the communication was made in the presence of individuals who were neither attorney nor client, or was disclosed to such individuals,
2. the communication was made for the purpose of committing a crime or tort,
3. the client has waived the privilege (for example by publicly disclosing the communication).

A corollary to the attorney–client privilege is the joint defense privilege, which is also called the common interest rule. The common interest rule "serves to protect the confidentiality of communications passing from one party to another party where a joint defense or strategy has been decided upon and undertaken by the parties and their respective counsel."

An attorney speaking publicly in regard to a client's personal business and private affairs can be reprimanded by the bar or disbarred, regardless of the fact that he or she may be no longer representing the client. Discussing a client's or past client's criminal history, or otherwise, is viewed as a breach of confidentiality.

The attorney–client privilege is separate from and should not be confused with the work-product doctrine.

== In the federal courts ==
If a case arises in the federal court system, the federal court will apply Rule 501 of the Federal Rules of Evidence to determine whether to apply the privilege law of the relevant state or federal common law. If the case is brought to the federal court under diversity jurisdiction, the law of the relevant state will be used to apply the privilege. If the case involves a federal question, the federal court will apply the federal common law of attorney–client privilege; however, Rule 501 grants flexibility to the federal courts, allowing them to construe the privilege "in light of experience and reason".

FRE 502(b) provides that inadvertent disclosures during a federal proceeding or to a federal office or agency do not act as a waiver of the privilege if the holder of the privilege "took reasonable steps to prevent disclosure" in the first place and "promptly took reasonable steps to rectify the error." Parties cannot merely state that they took "reasonable steps to prevent disclosure," instead they must give the court a detailed account of the procedures they took. Further, merely sending a letter demanding the return of privileged documents after discovering their inadvertent disclosure may not satisfy the requisite prompt response required.

== When the privilege may not apply ==
When an attorney is not acting primarily as an attorney but, for instance, as a business advisor, member of the Board of Directors, or in another non-legal role, then the privilege generally does not apply.

The privilege protects the confidential communication, and not the underlying information. For instance, if a client has previously disclosed confidential information to a third party who is not an attorney, and then gives the same information to an attorney, the attorney–client privilege will still protect the communication to the attorney, but will not protect the communication with the third party.

The privilege may be waived if the confidential communications are disclosed to third parties.

Other limits to the privilege may apply depending on the situation being adjudicated.

=== Disclosure ostensibly to support lawyer's own interests ===
Lawyers may disclose confidential information relating to the retainer where they are reasonably seeking to collect payment for services rendered. This is justified on policy grounds. If lawyers were unable to disclose such information, many would undertake legal work only where payment is made in advance. This would arguably adversely affect the public's access to justice.

Lawyers may also breach the duty where they are defending themselves against disciplinary or legal proceedings. A client who initiates proceedings against a lawyer effectively waives rights to confidentiality. This is justified on grounds of procedural fairness—a lawyer unable to reveal information relating to the retainer would be unable to defend themselves against such action.

=== Disclosure for the purpose of probate ===
Another case is for the probate of a last will and testament. Previously confidential communications between the lawyer and testator may be disclosed in order to prove that a will represented the intent of the now deceased decedent. In many instances, the will, codicil, or other parts of the estate plan require explanation or interpretation through other proof (extrinsic evidence), such as the attorney's file notes or correspondence from the client.

In certain cases, the client may desire or consent to revelation of personal or family secrets only after his or her death; for example, the will may leave a legacy to a paramour or a natural child.

Courts have occasionally revoked the privilege after the death of the client if it is deemed that doing so serves the client's intent, such as in the case of resolving testamentary disputes among heirs.

=== Crime–fraud exception ===
The crime–fraud exception can render the privilege moot when communications between an attorney and client are themselves used to further a crime, tort, or fraud. In Clark v. United States, the U.S. Supreme Court stated that "A client who consults an attorney for advice that will serve him in the commission of a fraud will have no help from the law. He must let the truth be told." The crime–fraud exception also does require that the crime or fraud discussed between client and attorney be carried out to be triggered. U.S. courts have not yet conclusively ruled how little knowledge an attorney can have of the underlying crime or fraud before the privilege detaches and the attorney's communications or requisite testimony become admissible.

== Tax evasion ==
A person who is worried about accusations of illegal activities, such as tax evasion, may decide to work only with an attorney or only with an accountant who is also an attorney; some or all of the resulting communications may be privileged provided that all the requirements for the attorney–client privilege are met. The mere fact that the practitioner is an attorney will not create a valid attorney–client privilege with respect to a communication. For example, if the practitioner provides business or accounting advice rather than legal advice, then attorney–client privilege might not be established. In the United States, communications between accountants and their clients are usually not privileged. Under federal tax law in the United States, for communications on or after July 22, 1998, there is a limited federally authorized accountant–client privilege that may apply to certain communications with non-attorneys.

== See also ==
- Admissible evidence
- Buried Bodies Case
- Contract attorney
- Legal professional privilege (England & Wales)
- Physician–patient privilege
- Priest–penitent privilege
- Privilege (evidence)
- Public Interest Immunity
- Reporter's privilege
- Spousal privilege
- State Secrets Privilege
- Subpoena ad testificandum
- Subpoena duces tecum
- Swidler & Berlin v. United States
- Upjohn v. United States
