= Documentary evidence =

Evidence which can be introduced at a trial in the form of documents

Documentary evidence is any evidence that is, or can be, introduced at a trial in the form of documents, as distinguished from oral testimony. Documentary evidence is most widely understood to refer to writings on paper (such as an invoice, a contract or a will), but the term can also apply to any media by which information can be preserved, such as photographs; a medium that needs a mechanical device to be viewed, such as a tape recording or film; and a printed form of digital evidence, such as emails or spreadsheets.

Normally, before documentary evidence is admissible as evidence, it must be proved by other evidence from a witness that the document is genuine, called "laying a foundation".

As a general rule of evidence, a document shall be proved by primary evidence that is document itself. No oral evidence of content of documents shall be admissible. But in certain circumstances the secondary evidence of documents including the oral evidence can be given. For instance, when original is lost or is in custody or possession of person against whom it is sought to be proved.

== Documentary v. physical evidence ==
A piece of evidence is not documentary evidence if it is presented for some purpose other than the examination of the contents of the document. For example, if a blood-spattered letter is introduced solely to show that the defendant stabbed the author of the letter from behind as it was being written, then the evidence is physical evidence, not documentary evidence. However, a film of the murder taking place would be documentary evidence (just as a written description of the event from an eyewitness). If the content of that same letter is then introduced to show the motive for the murder, then the evidence would be both physical and documentary.

== Authentication ==
Documentary evidence is subject to specific forms of authentication, usually through the testimony of an eyewitness to the execution of the document, or to the testimony of a witness able to identify the handwriting of the purported author. Documentary evidence is also subject to the best evidence rule, which requires that the original document be produced unless there is a good reason not to do so.
