= Christian worship =

Act of attributing reverent honour and homage to God

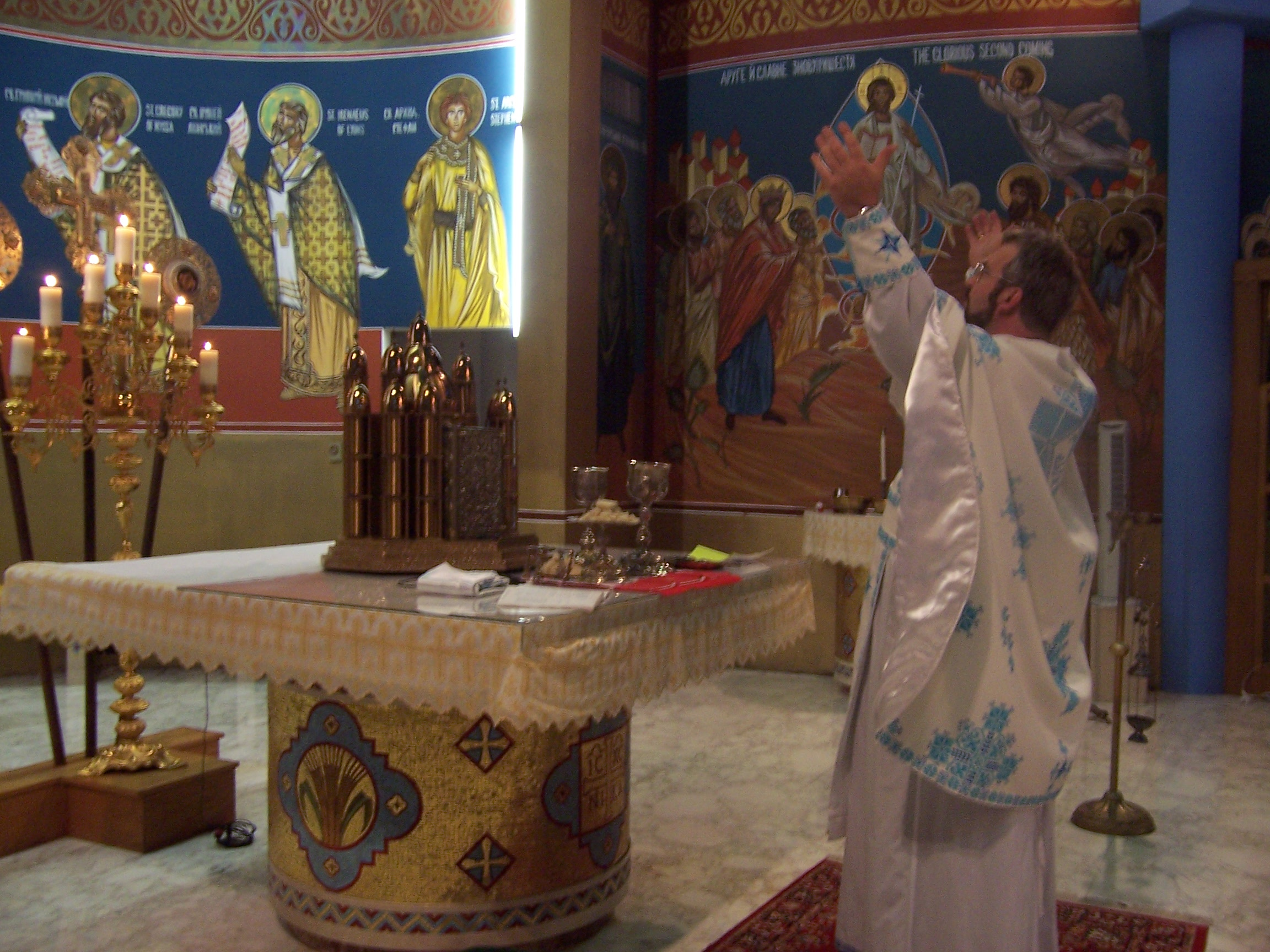
Worship at a Byzantine Catholic altar

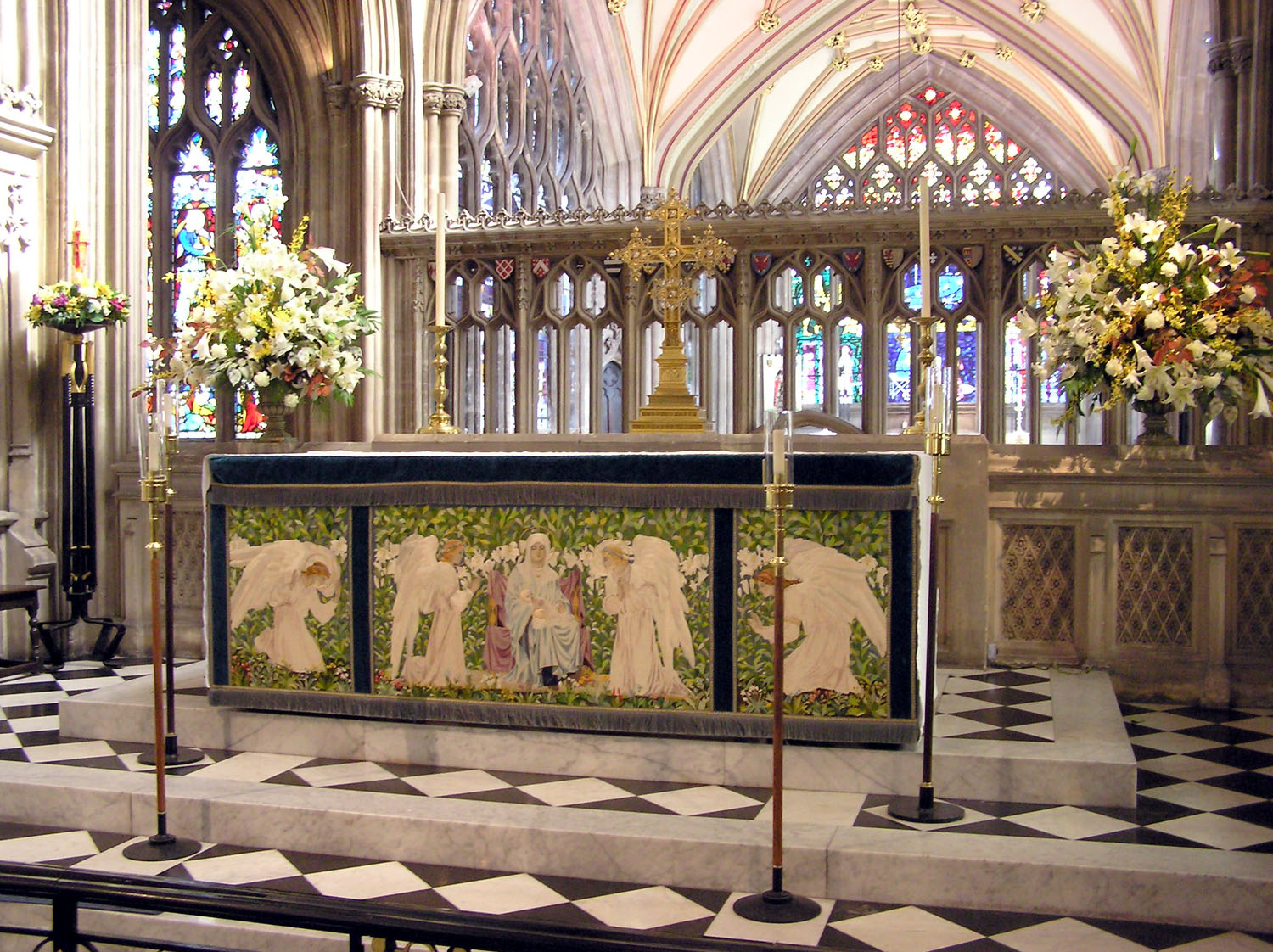
An altar is a stone or wooden table used for the celebration of the Eucharist in some Christian worship rites.

In Christianity, worship is the act of attributing reverent honour and homage to God. In the New Testament, various words are used to refer to the term worship. One is proskuneo ("to worship") which means to bow down to God or kings. Worship in the New Testament usually means expressions of praise or thanksgiving, as the appropriate human response to the magnificent glory of God.

Throughout most of Christianity's history, corporate Christian worship has been liturgical, characterized by prayers and hymns, with texts rooted in, or closely related to, the Bible (Scripture), particularly the Psalter, and centered on the altar (or table) and the Eucharist; this form of sacramental and ceremonial worship is still practiced by the Catholic, Eastern Orthodox, Lutheran and Anglican churches, as well as Methodism to a lesser extent. Baptist and Methodist services of worship may include extemporaneous prayer, the sharing of prayer requests, praise reports, and testimonies, as well as altar calls. In the Charismatic tradition worship is viewed as an act of adoration of God, with a more informal conception. "The holy act of singing together shapes faith, heals brokenness, transforms lives, and renews peace," according to one broad-based professional association. Among certain Christian denominations, such as those of traditional Anabaptism, the observance of various ordinances rooted in Scripture occurs during Christian worship, such as feetwashing, anointing with oil, and the wearing of headcoverings by women.

The term liturgy is derived from the Greek leitourgia meaning "public service" and is formed by two words: "laos" (people) and "ergon" (work), literally "work of the people". Responsorial prayers are a series of petitions read or sung by a leader with responses made by the congregation. Set times for prayer during the day were established (based substantially on Jewish models), and a festal cycle throughout the Church year governed the celebration of feasts and holy days pertaining to the events in the life of Jesus, the lives of the saints, and aspects of the Godhead.

A great deal of emphasis was placed on the forms of worship, as they were seen in terms of the Latin phrase lex orandi, lex credendi ("the rule of prayer is the rule of belief")—that is, the specifics of one's worship express, teach, and govern the doctrinal beliefs of the community. According to this view, alterations in the patterns and content of worship would necessarily reflect a change in the faith itself. Each time a heresy arose in the Church, it was typically accompanied by a shift in worship for the heretical group. Orthodoxy in faith also meant orthodoxy in worship, and vice versa. Thus, unity in Christian worship was understood to be a fulfillment of Jesus' words that the time was at hand when true worshipers would worship "in spirit and in truth" (John 4:23).

== Early Church Fathers ==
The theme of worship is taken up by many of the Church Fathers including Justin Martyr, Irenaeus and Hippolytus of Rome (c. 170 – c. 236). The Holy Eucharist was the central act of worship in early Christianity. The liturgy of the synagogues and the ritual of the Jewish temple, both of which were participated in by early Christians, helped shape the form of the early Christian liturgy, which was a dual liturgy of the word and of the Eucharist; this early structure of the liturgy still exists in the Catholic Mass and Eastern Divine Liturgy. The early Christian use of incense in worship first originated in Christian funeral rites, and was later used during regular worship services. Incense was also used in the Bible to worship God and symbolize prayer, in both the Old Testament and New Testament; one of the three Magi offered Christ frankincense, and in the Book of Revelation, angels and saints appear in Heaven offering incense to God, thus setting a precedent for Christian use of incense in worship.

== Reformation liturgies ==
Worship as singing underwent great changes for some Christians within the Protestant Reformation. Martin Luther, a music lover, composed hymns that are still sung today, and expected congregations to be active participants in the service, singing along.

John Calvin, in Geneva, argued that while instrumental music had its time with the Levites of the Old Testament, it was no longer a proper expression for the church. This was expanded upon by John Knox (see Presbyterian worship); only Psalms were sung, and they were sung a cappella. Furthermore, in the Genevan and Scottish Reformed tradition, man-made hymns are not sung, being seen inferior to the God-inspired psalms of the Bible. The Calvinist Regulative Principle of Worship distinguishes traditional Presbyterian and Reformed churches from the Lutheran or other Protestant churches. Though historic Anglicanism was theologically Reformed, it leaned closer to Lutheran liturgy.

== Present day ==
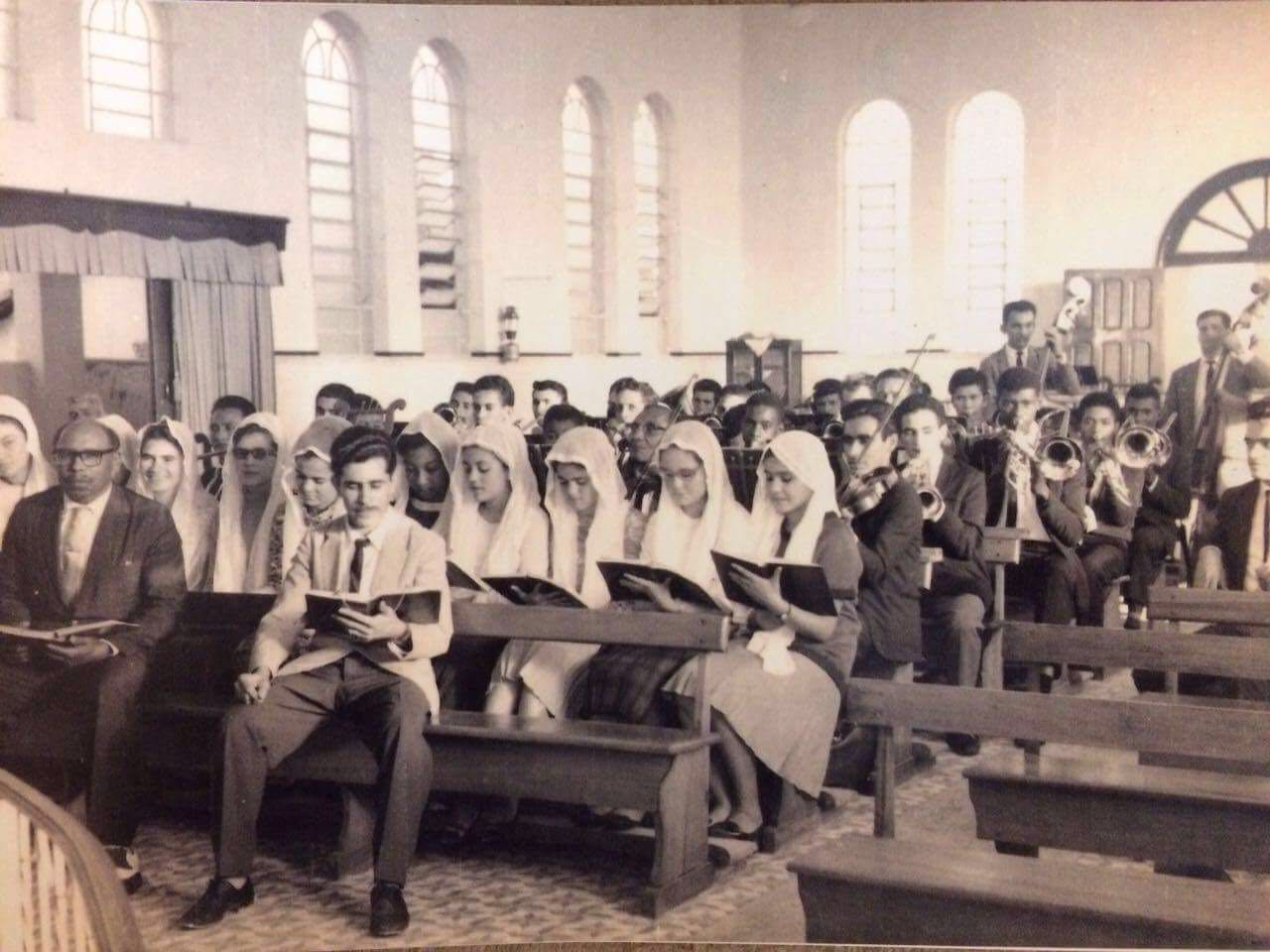
A congregation during a Christian service of worship, with women observing the ordinance of headcovering (Brazil)

Current Christian worship practices are diverse in modern Christianity, with a range of customs and theological views. Three broad groupings can be identified, and whilst some elements are universal, style and content varies greatly due to the history and differing emphases of the various branches of Christianity.

In many Christian traditions, regular public worship is complemented by worship in private and small groups, such as meditation, prayer and study. Singing often forms an important part of Christian worship.

=== Common elements ===
While differing considerably in form, the following items characterise the worship of virtually all Christian churches.

- Meeting on Sunday (Sabbath in Christianity; Sabbath in seventh-day churches is an exception)
- Bible reading
- Communion or the Eucharist
- Music, either choral or congregational, either with or without instrumental accompaniment
- Prayer
- Teaching in the form of a sermon or homily
- A collection or offering

=== Sacramental tradition ===
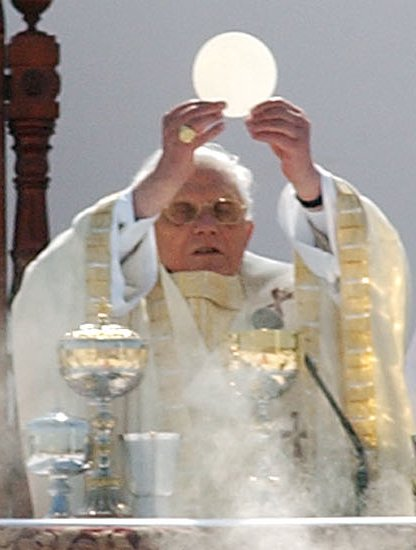
Pope Benedict XVI elevating the Eucharist for worship of the faithful amidst incense

This grouping can also be referred to as the Eucharistic tradition, which includes the Oriental Orthodox churches, the Eastern Orthodox churches, the Lutheran churches, and most branches of the Anglican Communion. Worship (variously known as the Mass, Divine Liturgy, and Divine Service) is formal and centres on the offering of thanks and praise for the death and resurrection of Christ over the people's offerings of bread and wine, breaking the bread, and the receiving of the Eucharist, seen as the body and blood of Jesus Christ. Churches in this group understand worship as a mystic participation in the death and resurrection of Christ, through which they are united with him and with each other. Services are structured according to a liturgy and typically include other elements such as prayers, psalms, hymns, choral music (including polyphonic chant, plainchant, and hymnody) the reading of Scripture, and some form of teaching or homily. In the theology of the Catholic Church, the Mass takes on another dimension, that of a sacrifice which involves a ritualistic re-presentation of the Body and Blood of Christ to God the Father. The Lutheran churches teach that the Sacrifice of the Mass (sacrificium eucharistikon) is a sacrifice of thanksgiving and praise (sacrificia laudis). The liturgy, normally led by a priest who wears vestments (a form of sacred clothing), includes the ritual usage of sacred liturgical vessels, incense, candles, and holy water, and may include ritual acts of bowing, prostration, kneeling, kissing sacred images and relics, and crossing oneself. In the Catholic Church there is a diversity of ancient liturgical rites: the Roman Rite (including both the Tridentine Mass and the ordinary-form Roman Rite) the Byzantine Rite, the Ge'ez Rite, and the Antiochene Rite to name several of the more prominent examples. The Lutheran churches have the Western Rite (based on the Formula Missae) and the Byzantine Rite.

Within the Catholic Church and the Lutheran churches, the charismatic movement has had much less influence, although modern Christian hymnody is found in some parishes, owing a large part to a movement known as the Catholic Charismatic Renewal. Worship practices in the Eastern Churches have largely remained traditional.

=== Reformed traditions ===
In the Reformed tradition (historically inclusive of the Continental Reformed, Anglican, Presbyterian and Congregationalist traditions), corporate worship is shaped by the legacy of the Reformation. Worship in such a context also generally features spoken prayer, Scripture readings, congregational singing of hymns, and a sermon. Some liturgy is normally used but may not be described as such. The Lord's Supper, or Communion, is celebrated less frequently (intervals vary from once a week to once a month according to the denomination or local church). Vestments may include the alb or the Geneva gown.

=== Baptist and Methodist traditions ===
Baptist and Methodist services including the singing of hymns and prayer, as well as the sermon (on which emphasis is placed). Baptist and Methodist services of worship may include extemporaneous prayer, the sharing of prayer requests, praise reports, testimonies, and altar calls. Baptisms and Holy Communion, as well as footwashing, are celebrated often once monthly to once a quarter.

Outside of worship on the Lord's Day (Sunday morning service and Sunday evening service), Baptists and Methodists often hold revival services, tent revivals, and camp meetings. These services, for Methodists, are aimed at preaching the New Birth and entire sanctification, as well as energizing believers and calling backsliders to repentance. Lovefeasts are observed by a number of Methodist congregations, usually once every quarter.

=== Charismatic tradition ===
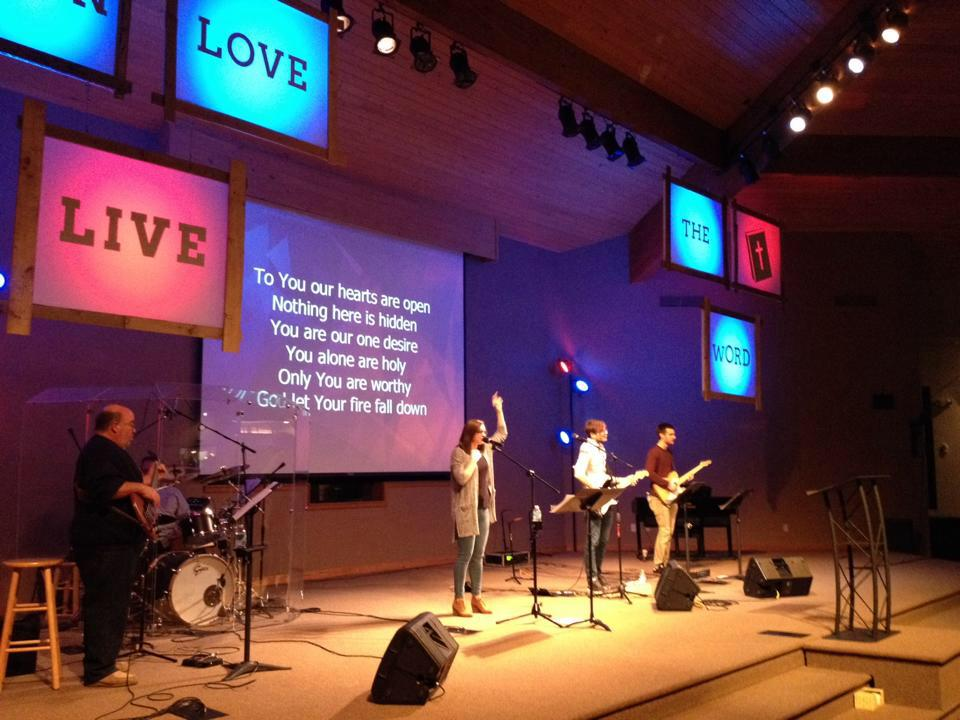
A contemporary worship team leads the congregation in praise and worship.

In Charismatic Christianity (including pentecostalism, the charismatic movement, neo-charismatic movement and certain parts of nondenominational Christianity), worship is viewed like an act of adoration of God, with a more informal conception. Some gatherings take place in auditoriums with few religious signs. There is no dress style. Since the beginning of charismatic movement of the 1960s there have been significant changes to Christian worship practices of many denominations. A new music-centered approach to worship, known as contemporary worship, is now commonplace. This replaces the traditional order of worship based around liturgy or a "hymn-prayer sandwich" with extended periods of congregational singing sometimes referred to as "block worship". The worship has two parts; one in the beginning with music and the second part with sermon and Lord's Supper.

In the 1980s and 1990s, Contemporary worship music settled in many evangelical churches. This music is written in the style of popular music, Christian rock or folk music and therefore differs considerably from traditional hymns. It is frequently played on a range of instruments that would not have previously been used in churches such as guitars (including electric) and drum kits.

== Types of Christian worship ==
Services of worship on the Lord's Day (Sundays) are a part of mainstream Christian traditions, especially those following Sunday Sabbatarianism (First-day Sabbatarianism). The Eucharist may be celebrated at some or all of these; ranging from daily to once a week to once a month or once a quarter. Saturday Sabbatarians (Seventh-day Sabbatarians) have their main weekly services on Saturday rather than Sunday. On the Lord's Day, a number of denominations (following the historic Reformed, Methodist and Baptist views of Sunday Sabbatarianism) have a service of worship in the morning and one in the evening.

The Catholic church refers to services of worship conducted together by persons of different denominations as "common worship" (Latin: communicatio in sacris).

=== Sacraments, ordinances, holy mysteries ===
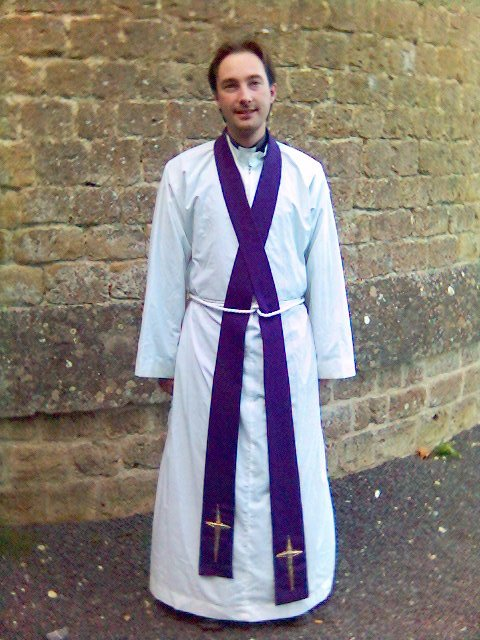
Some clergy may wear vestments such as the alb (pictured) when celebrating rites such as baptism.

- Common to all historic churches:
  - Baptism
  - Eucharist, Communion, Lord's Supper
- Sacraments/Holy Mysteries Common to the East, to Lutheranism, and to Roman Catholicism:
  - Confession
- Sacraments/Holy Mysteries Common to the East and to Roman Catholicism:
  - Chrismation (Eastern) / Confirmation (Western)
  - Marriage
  - Ordination
  - Anointing of the Sick (Unction)

Lutherans see baptism, the Eucharist, and confession and absolution as sacraments. Lutherans recognize and practice marriage, confirmation, ordination, and the anointing of the sick as rites (though Lutherans teach that as they do not forgive sins, they are therefore are not sacraments in the strict sense).

- Ordinances of Conservative Anabaptism (Dunkard Brethren Church, Conservative Mennonite fellowships, Beachy Amish fellowships, and the Apostolic Christian Church):
  - Baptism
  - Feetwashing
  - Communion
  - Holy kiss
  - Headcovering (veiling)
  - Marriage
  - Anointing of the sick

In the Dunkard Brethren Church (part of Conservative Anabaptism), feetwashing, communion and the holy kiss occur during the lovefeast. In addition to other Conservative Anabaptist denominations that observe the lovefeast, the lovefeast is observed by the Moravian Church and the Methodist churches.

- Baptists, Methodists and Pentecostals see Baptism and Communion as ordinances or sacraments, with a number of Baptists, Methodists and Pentecostals including feetwashing and headcovering as an ordinance.

== Adoration versus veneration ==
The New Testament uses various words translatable as "worship". The word proskuneo - "to worship" - means to bow down to Gods or kings.

Catholicism, Anglicanism, Oriental Orthodoxy, and Eastern Orthodoxy make a technical distinction between two different concepts:

- adoration or latria (Latin adoratio, Greek latreia, [λατρεία]), which is due to God alone
- veneration or dulia (Latin veneratio, Greek douleia [δουλεία]), which may be lawfully offered to the saints

The external acts of veneration resemble those of worship, but differ in their object and intent. Protestant Christians, who reject the veneration of saints, question whether Catholics always maintain such a distinction in actual devotional practice, especially at the level of folk religion.

According to Mark Miravalle the English word "worship" is equivocal, in that it has been used (in Catholic writing, at any rate) to denote both adoration/latria and veneration/dulia, and in some cases even as a synonym for veneration as distinct from adoration:

As St. Thomas Aquinas explains, adoration, which is known as latria in classical theology, is the worship and homage that is rightly offered to God alone. It is the manifestation of submission, and acknowledgement of dependence, appropriately shown towards the excellence of an uncreated divine person and to his absolute Lordship. It is the worship of the Creator that God alone deserves. Although we see in English a broader usage of the word "adoration" which may not refer to a form of worship exclusive to God—for example, when a husband says that he "adores his wife"—in general it can be maintained that adoration is the best English denotation for the worship of latria.

Veneration, known as dulia in classical theology, the honor and reverence appropriately due to the excellence of a created person. Excellence exhibited by created beings likewise deserves recognition and honor. We see a general example of veneration in events like the awarding of academic awards for excellence in school, or the awarding of olympic medals for excellence in sports. There is nothing contrary to the proper adoration of God when we offer the appropriate honor and recognition that created persons deserve based achievement in excellence.

We must make a further clarification regarding the use of the term "worship" in relation to the categories of adoration and veneration. Historically, schools of theology have used the term "worship" as a general term which included both adoration and veneration. They would distinguish between "worship of adoration" and "worship of veneration." The word "worship" (in a similar way to how the liturgical term "cult" is traditionally used) was not synonymous with adoration, but could be used to introduce either adoration or veneration. Hence Catholic sources will sometimes use the term "worship" not to indicate adoration, but only the worship of veneration given to Mary and the saints.

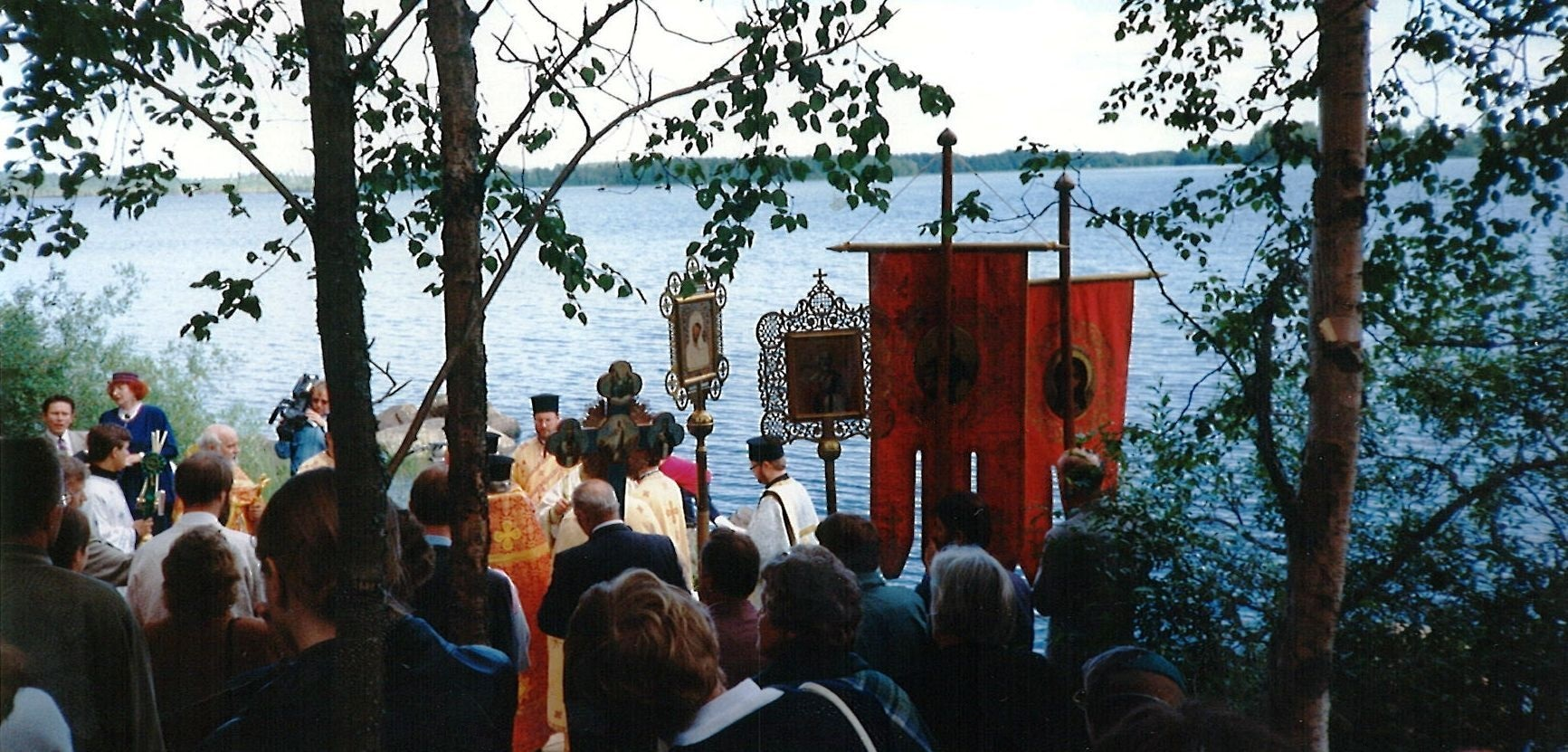
Ilja Praasniekka, the Elijah Day worship on the shore of lake in Ilomantsi, Finland in July 1996

Orthodox Judaism and orthodox Sunni Islam hold that for all practical purposes veneration should be considered the same as prayer; Orthodox Judaism (arguably with the exception of some Chasidic practices), orthodox Sunni Islam, and most kinds of Protestantism forbid veneration of saints or of angels, classifying these actions as akin to idolatry.

Similarly, Jehovah's Witnesses assert that many actions classified as patriotic by Protestant groups, such as saluting a flag, count as equivalent to worship and are therefore considered idolatrous as well.

== See also ==
- Alternative worship
- Church service
- Contemporary worship
- Devotional literature
- Magnificat
- Service of worship
- Theological aesthetics
