= Best Evidence =

Best Evidence may refer to:

- Best Evidence (TV series), a 2007 documentary television series
- Best Evidence (book), a 1980 book by David Lifton
- Best evidence rule, a common law rule of evidence
- "UFO Best Evidence", an episode of the documentary television show Unexplained Mysteries
- Best Evidence Encyclopedia, reviews of research on reading instruction programs
