= Demonstrative evidence =

Demonstrative evidence is evidence in the form of a representation of an object. This is, as opposed to, real evidence, testimony, or other forms of evidence used at trial.

== Examples ==
Examples of demonstrative evidence include photos, x-rays, videotapes, movies, sound recordings, forensic animation, diagrams, maps, drawings and other trial graphics, simulations, and models. It is useful for assisting a finder of fact in establishing context among the facts presented in a case. To be admissible, a demonstrative exhibit must “fairly and accurately” represent the real object at the relevant time.

Other examples of demonstrative evidence include case specific medical exhibits, colorized diagnostic films, general anatomy and surgery exhibits. These forms of demonstrative evidence are commonly used as a personal injury lawyer resource. Demonstrative evidence with dramatic impact can maximize the value of a case by effectively depicting catastrophic/traumatic injuries, complex surgical procedures, surgical mistakes or summarize injuries suffered by an individual. These examples of demonstrative evidence are used for settlement conferences, arbitration, mediation, medical expert depositions and trial presentations.

=== In patent litigation ===
Demonstrative evidence is an effective aid in infringement litigation.

Whether prosecuting an infringer or defending a patent, originally filed patent drawings which are a part of most patent applications, can play an imperative part in any upcoming litigation. If the original patent drawings are not complete, accurate and exact, then the resulting output for litigation graphics is unreliable and could even hurt a case.

There are many ways to convert patent drawings into effective litigation graphics.

- A patent drawing can be made visually transparent and overplayed onto an opposing image to show likeness or differences.
- Color can be applied to elements of the original patent drawings and the same colors on similar elements of an opposing images to highlight likeness.
- A front view from the application can be placed alongside a front view of the opposing invention with additions outlined in color to emphasize differences.
- A process flow chart from a utility patent application can be used alongside a flow chart of the opposing party with an insert between the two to indicate differences or similarities in process.*
- Callout information on a patent drawing can clarify key elements of the invention and emphasize important features.
- Drawings from a patent application can be used in PowerPoint to create a simple tutorial using animation with color arrows, overlays and voice over to explain an invention.
- Original patent drawings can be used as a basis to create complex 3D animations. Operation, technical procedures, incompatibilities between inventions and moving parts of an invention can be clearly presented. Furthermore, animations can indicate time, motion or speed, compare alternative theories or simplify highly complex data.

Using original patent drawings as a starting point can save cost of having to start from scratch, although some litigants prefer to use drawings made specifically for litigation.

In many patent lawsuits filed, a substantial amount is spent on demonstrative evidence. WIPO Magazine stated that in 2012, “over 5,000 patent lawsuits – an all-time record – were filed, each costing on average around US$2.8 million.”

== History ==
Before photographs and other demonstrative evidence, lawyers relied on purely testimonial or substantive evidence. Melvin Belli and Earl Rogers helped change that by introducing more demonstrative evidence. Scientific evidence emerged in the 1960s.

== Mechanics of use ==
In American jurisprudence, demonstrative evidence, like any other kind of evidence must be relevant. At this point the proponent of the demonstrative evidence can either try to get the evidence admitted into the official record of the case or can choose to use the evidence as merely a prop. If the proponent of the evidence wants to have the evidence included in the official record of the case, the proponent will first ask for the evidence to be marked by the court for identification purposes. After the evidence is marked for identification, the proponent of the demonstrative evidence must lay a foundation. It is at this time that the relevancy of the demonstrative evidence is usually challenged. Laying of a foundation explains how the demonstrative evidence relates to the facts of the case and establishes the evidence's authenticity. Once the foundation is laid, the proponent may ask to officially move the piece of evidence into the record where it is marked as a full exhibit. If the evidence is marked as a full exhibit the jury may refer to the evidence during deliberations and in most jurisdictions the jury may examine the evidence during deliberations. If the evidence is not marked as a full exhibit, the jury cannot do these things. As a matter of courtesy, the proponent of the demonstrative evidence generally shows the piece of evidence to the opposing party before marking it for identification purposes. In criminal cases certain kinds of demonstrative evidence are subject to mandatory disclosure under the case law governing discovery. See Brady v. Maryland. While the law distinguishes between illustrative and substantive demonstratives, and jurors note this difference, jurors award damages regardless of the evidentiary status of demonstratives

== Popular culture ==
Examples of demonstrative evidence from popular culture include their use in these motion pictures:

- The Rainmaker - use of a plaque to show the number of claims filed and accepted
- Erin Brockovich - charts and files
- A Few Good Men - logs and photographs
- My Cousin Vinny - photographs, tape measure
