= Inflammatory =

Inflammatory may refer to:

- Inflammation, a biological response to harmful stimuli
- The word inflammatory is also used to refer literally to fire and flammability,
- and figuratively in relation to comments that are provocative and arouse passions and emotions.
- An objection (United States law)
