= Objection (United States law) =

Formal protest raised in court during a trial

In the law of the United States of America, an objection is a formal protest to evidence, argument, or questions that are in violation of the rules of evidence or other procedural law. Objections are often raised in court during a trial to disallow a witness's testimony, and may also be raised during depositions and in response to written discovery.

During trials and depositions, an objection is typically raised after the opposing party asks a question of the witness, but before the witness can answer, or when the opposing party is about to enter something into evidence. At trial, the judge then makes a ruling on whether the objection is "sustained" (the judge agrees with the objection and disallows the question, testimony, or evidence) or "overruled" (the judge disagrees with the objection and allows the question, testimony, or evidence). An attorney may choose to "rephrase" a question that has been objected to, so long as the judge permits it. Lawyers should make an objection before there is an answer to the question. Research finds that frequent objections by attorneys do not alienate jurors.

== Objections in general ==
An attorney may also raise an objection against a judge's ruling, to preserve the right to appeal that ruling. Under certain circumstances, a court may need to hold some kind of pretrial hearing and make evidentiary rulings to resolve important issues like personal jurisdiction, or whether to impose sanctions for extreme misconduct by parties or counsel. As with trials, a party or their counsel normally raises objections to evidence presented at the hearing in order to ask the court to disregard impermissible evidence or argument, as well as to preserve such objections as a basis for interlocutory or final appeals from such rulings.

Objections are also commonly used in depositions during the discovery process to preserve the right to exclude testimony from being considered as evidence in support of, or in opposition to, a later motion, such as a motion for summary judgment.

== Exceptions ==
Historically, at trial, an attorney had to promptly take an "exception" (by saying "I except" followed by a reason) immediately after an objection was overruled in order to preserve it for appeal, or else the objection was permanently waived. In addition, at the end of the trial, the attorney had to submit a written "bill of exceptions" that listed all exceptions they intended to appeal on—which the judge then signed and sealed, making it part of the record to be reviewed on appeal.

The bill of exceptions was a relic of the early English practice in which parties submitted their pleadings orally (by reciting their allegations and pleas orally in open court) and the court ruled on those pleadings orally, and the court clerk recorded what had transpired in summary form in the written minutes of the court. Early on, English trial courts developed the habit of evading appellate review of their rulings by having their clerks not record certain rulings which overruled or disallowed various issues raised by the parties. Parliament solved that problem with the 31st chapter of the Statute of Westminster 1285, which forced trial court judges to apply their court's seal to a party's written bill of exceptions and in turn allowed the bill to become part of the appellate record.

After modern American courts began to use court reporters to create accurate, comprehensive, and verbatim written transcripts of their proceedings, lawyers and judges came to recognize that exceptions were unnecessary because the objection itself and the context of the surrounding record are all the appellate court really needs to resolve a disputed issue. Starting in the 1930s, exceptions were abolished in the federal courts and in many state courts as well. For example, California technically did not abolish exceptions, but merely rendered them superfluous by simply treating just about every ruling of the trial court as automatically excepted to. Thus, in nearly all U.S. courts, it is now sufficient that the objection was clearly made on the record.

== Continuing objection ==
A continuing objection is an objection an attorney makes to a series of questions about a related point. A continuing objection may be made, in the discretion of the court, to preserve an issue for appeal without distracting the factfinder (whether jury or judge) with an objection to every question. A continuing objection is made where the objection itself is overruled, but the trial judge permits a silent continuing objection to that point so that there are fewer interruptions. An example of this is when a lawyer could be held negligent for not objecting to a particular line of questioning, yet has had previous objections overruled.

== List of objections ==
Proper reasons for objecting to a question asked to a witness include:

- Ambiguous, confusing, misleading, vague, unintelligible: the question is not clear and precise enough for the witness to properly answer.
- Arguing the law: counsel is instructing the jury on the law.
- Argumentative: the question makes an argument rather than asking a question.
- Asked and answered: when the same attorney continues to ask the same question and they have already received an answer. Usually seen after direct examination, but not always.
- Asking a question unrelated to an intelligent exercise of a peremptory challenge or challenge for cause: if opposing counsel asks such a question during voir dire (i.e. the jury selection process).
- Asks the jury to prejudge the evidence: the jury cannot promise to vote a certain way, even if certain facts are proved.
- Assumes facts not in evidence: the question assumes something as true for which no evidence has been shown. In its strictest form, this objection presents obvious bootstrapping problems, since examination of a witness must start somewhere. To get around that, courts usually tolerate a few broad questions at the start of examination, but expect counsel to use the answers thus elicited as a foundation for examination on more specific and material matters.
- Badgering: counsel is antagonizing the witness to provoke a response, either by asking questions without giving the witness an opportunity to answer or by openly mocking the witness.
- Best evidence rule: requires that the original source of evidence is required, if available; for example, rather than asking a witness about the contents of a document, the actual document should be entered into evidence. A full original document should be introduced into evidence instead of a copy, but judges often allow copies if there is no dispute about authenticity. Some documents are exempt from hearsay rules of evidence.
- Beyond the scope: a question asked during cross-examination must be within the scope of direct, and so on.
- Calls for a conclusion: the question asks for an opinion rather than facts.
- Calls for speculation: the question asks the witness to guess the answer rather than to rely on known facts.
- Compound question: multiple questions asked together.
- Counsel is testifying: a lawyer is making an unsworn statement as to a fact without separate evidence.
- Foundation: the question relates to matters of which the witness's personal knowledge has not been established.
- Hearsay: An out of court statement used to prove the fact that the statement is being offered for. However, there are several exceptions to the rule against hearsay in most legal systems.
- Incompetent: the witness is not qualified to answer the question.
- Inflammatory: the question is intended to cause prejudice.
- Irrelevant or immaterial: the question is not about the issues in the trial.
- Leading question (direct examination only): the question suggests the answer to the witness. Leading questions are permitted if the attorney conducting the examination has received permission to treat the witness as a hostile witness. Leading questions are also permitted on cross-examination, as witnesses called by the opposing party are presumed hostile.
- Misstates evidence / misquotes witness / improper characterization of evidence: this objection is often overruled, but can be used to signal a problem to witness, judge and jury.
- Narrative: the question asks the witness to relate a story rather than state specific facts. This objection is not always proper even when a question invites a narrative response, as narrative testimony may be required or preferred due to the circumstances of the case.
- Privilege: the witness may be protected by law from answering the question.

A few of the foregoing objections may also apply to the witness's response, particularly hearsay, privilege, and relevance. An objection to form—to the wording of a question rather than its subject matter—is not itself a distinct objection reason, but a category that includes ambiguity, leading, compounding and others. Court rules vary as to whether an "objection to form," by itself, preserves the objection on the record or requires further specification.

Proper reasons for objecting to material evidence include:

- Best evidence rule or hearsay evidence: requires that the original source of evidence is required, if available. However, some documents are self-authenticating under Rule 902, such as (1) domestic public documents under seal, (2) domestic public documents not under seal, but bearing a signature of a public officer, (3) foreign public documents, (4) certified copies of public records, (5) official publications, (6) newspapers and periodicals, (7) trade inscriptions and the like, (8) acknowledged documents (i.e., by a notary public), (9) commercial paper and related documents, (10) presumptions under Acts of Congress, (11) certified domestic records of regularly conducted activity, (12) certified foreign records of regularly conducted activity.
- Fruit of the poisonous tree: the evidence was obtained illegally, or the investigative methods leading to its discovery were illegal. Can be circumvented; see inevitable discovery.
- Incomplete: opposing party only introducing part of the writing (conversation/act/declaration), taken out of context. Under the evidence rule providing for completeness, other parties can move to introduce additional parts. If any documents are presented for review, the judge and other party are entitled to a complete copy, not a partial copy, of the document. When a witness is presented with a surprise document, he should be able to take time to study it before he can answer any questions.
- Lack of foundation: the evidence lacks testimony as to its authenticity or source.
- More prejudicial than probative: Under Federal Rule of Evidence 403, a judge has the discretion to exclude evidence if "its probative value is substantially outweighed by the danger of unfair prejudice, confusion of the issues, or misleading the jury."

Proper reasons for objecting to a witness's answer include, but are not limited to:

- Narrative: the witness is relating a story in response to a question that does not call for one. Not all witnesses' answers are susceptible to this objection, as questions can and often do call for a narrative response, especially on direct examination.
- Non-responsive: the witness's response constitutes an answer to a question other than the one that was asked, or no answer at all.
- Nothing pending: the witness continues to speak on matters irrelevant to the question. For example, an attorney who asks, "Did your mother call?" and gets the answer, "Yes, she called at 3:00," can object to the latter part. Attorneys can use this objection selectively (to avoid annoying the court) when a witness adds out-of-order remarks to answers.

== Speaking objection ==
An objection that goes beyond stating a proper objection reason, as listed above, is known as a speaking objection. Courts normally discourage speaking objections and may sanction them when they impede legal process, whether by delaying the proceedings or by adding non-evidentiary material to the record. The Federal Rules of Civil Procedure require objections during a deposition to be stated "concisely in a nonargumentative and nonsuggestive manner." Speaking objections nonetheless occur in practice and are sometimes used, with caution, to communicate the nature of the objection to a party without a legal background.
