= Discovery Channel =

American cable television channel

- Country: United States
- Broadcast area: Nationwide
- Headquarters: 230 Park Avenue South New York City, U.S.

Programming
- Languages: English; Spanish (with SAP)
- Picture format: 1080i HDTV (downscaled to 480i letterbox for the SDTV feed)

Ownership
- Owner: Skydance
- Parent: Skydance TV

History
- Launched: June 17, 1985; 41 years ago
- Former names: The Discovery Channel (1985–1995)

Links
- Website: discovery.com

Availability

Streaming media
- Affiliated streaming services: Discovery+; HBO Max
- Services: Sling TV, YouTube TV, Philo, Hulu + Live TV

Discovery Channel, also known as simply Discovery and previously known as The Discovery Channel, is an American cable channel owned by Skydance that is best known for airing ongoing reality and educational programming.

Launched on June 17, 1985, it initially broadcast documentary television programming focused primarily on popular science, nature, technology, and history. Since the 2010s, it had become increasingly dominated by programs that focused on conspiracy theories or promoted pseudoscience.

By June 2012, Discovery Channel was the third most widely distributed subscription channel in the United States, behind now-sibling channel TBS and the Weather Channel; it is available in 409 million households globally. As of November 2023, Discovery Channel is available to approximately 71,000,000 pay television households in the United States-down from its peak of 99,000,000 in 2011.

== History ==
=== 1980s ===
Channel's logo from 1985 to 1987

John Hendricks founded the channel and its parent company, Cable Educational Network Inc., in 1982. Several investors (including the BBC, Allen & Company, and Venture America) raised $5 million in start-up capital to launch the network. Initially, channel's launch was planned on December 17, 1984.

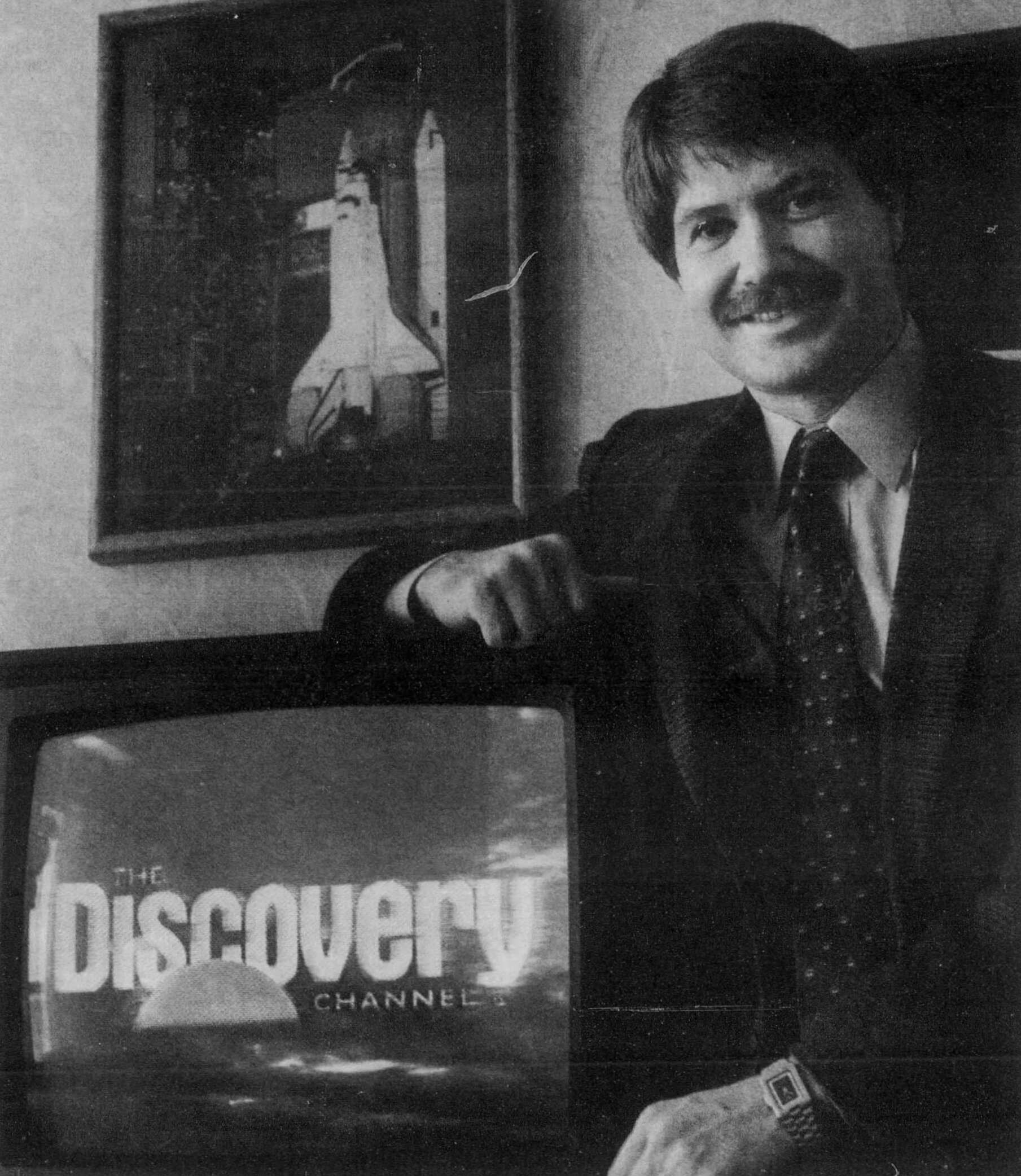
John Hendricks, founder of Discovery Channel, in 1988

The Discovery Channel began broadcasting on June 17, 1985. It was initially available to 156,000 households and broadcast for 12 hours each day between 3 p.m. and 3 a.m. About 75 percent of its program content had never been broadcast on U.S. television before. In its early years, the channel's focus centered on educational programming in the form of cultural and wildlife documentaries, and science and historical specials. It also broadcast some Soviet programming during this time, including the news program Vremya. The channel also carried two teletext services over its VBI during this time. Infotext offered news from the Associated Press, as well as information about agribusiness and agriculture, including commodity prices from the Chicago Mercantile Exchange on a 15-minute delay. Datavizion offered trivia, strange news stories, games and a satellite TV guide. Both services originated from WHA-TV in Madison, Wisconsin, and were run by the University of Wisconsin-Madison.

In June 1986, channel reached 7.5 million homes.

=== 1990s and 2000s ===
During the late 1990s to early 2000s, the channel began to attract a broader audience by incorporating more reality-based series focusing on automotive, occupational, and investigative series. Although the refocused programming strategy proved popular, Discovery Channel's ratings began to decline by the middle of the 2000s. Some critics said such shows strayed from Discovery's intention of providing more educationally based shows aimed at helping viewers learn about the world around them. In 2005, Discovery changed its programming focus to include more popular science and historical themes. The network's ratings eventually recovered in 2006.

On January 4, 2006, Discovery Communications announced that anchor Ted Koppel, executive producer Tom Bettag, and eight other former staff members from the ABC newsmagazine Nightline were joining Discovery Channel. The network was nominated for seven Primetime Emmy Awards that year for shows including The Flight that Fought Back (a documentary about the hijacking of United Airlines Flight 93 during the terrorist attacks of September 11, 2001) and Deadliest Catch (a reality series about a group of seafood fishermen).

In 2007, Discovery Channel's top series included the Emmy Award– and Peabody Award–winning Planet Earth, Dirty Jobs, MythBusters, and Deadliest Catch. Discovery Channel's 2008 lineup included Fight Quest and Smash Lab.

=== 2010s ===
On September 1, 2010, James Jay Lee entered the Discovery Communications headquarters in Silver Spring, Maryland, armed with a handgun. Lee fired at least one shot and held several employees hostage; he was later shot dead by police. Lee had published criticisms of the network at Savetheplanetprotest.com.

In December 2015, Discovery Communications launched its TV Everywhere service, Discovery Go, which features live and video-on-demand content from Discovery Channel and eight of its sister networks.

QuestOD was launched in 2018 as a Video on Demand to Discovery's free-to-air television channels Quest and Quest Red.

=== 2020s ===
In October 2020, Discovery announced that it would rebrand its Dplay service as Discovery+ (stylized as discovery+) in the United Kingdom and Ireland, the new service commenced in November 2020 and also offers paid content as well as the free content from Dplay. In December 2020, Discovery announced that a separate version of Discovery+ would also be launching in other European countries and the United States in January 2021. On January 5, 2021, Dplay was replaced by Discovery+ in Europe.

== Programming ==
Programming on the flagship Discovery Channel in the U.S. is primarily focused on reality television series, such as speculative investigation (with shows such as MythBusters, Unsolved History, and Best Evidence), automobiles, and occupations (such as Dirty Jobs and Deadliest Catch). A popular annual feature on the channel is Shark Week, which airs on Discovery during the summer months.

Discovery has also featured documentaries specifically aimed at families and younger audiences. Other popular programs have included How It's Made, Cash Cab, and Man vs. Wild.

== Non-television ventures ==
=== Pro Cycling Team ===
Shortly before the 2004 Tour de France, Discovery Channel announced it would become the primary sponsor of a professional bicycling team starting in 2005, featuring the then-seven-time Tour de France winner Lance Armstrong, whose wins were voided after he was proven to have cheated via doping. After the 2007 victory with the Spaniard Alberto Contador, Discovery Channel discontinued the cycling sponsorship.

=== Store ===
The Discovery Channel stores first opened in 1995. By 1997, the chain had 17 US and 1 UK stores. At that time, the chain was building a flagship store in Washington, DC, with three levels themed to various environments—sea and underground, land and outer space, aviation and science—to be opened in February 1998, with another flagship store in San Francisco to be opened in November 1998.

On May 17, 2007, Discovery Communications announced it would close its standalone and mall-based stores. Hudson Group will continue to operate the Discovery Channel Airport Stores, and the website remains in operation.

=== Telescope ===
Discovery Channel funded the construction of the Lowell Discovery Telescope, in partnership with Lowell Observatory.

=== Website ===
Discovery.com is the Discovery Channel's official website, which primarily provides information on the channel's programming and additional content, including articles, tied to those shows.

== Marketing and branding ==
The logo of Discovery Channel from 1987 to 1995.

The Discovery Channel's first logo was a television screen picturing a map of the world. For two decades, starting in 1987, the channel's logo incorporated the Discovery wordmark rendered in the Aurora Bold Condensed font with a circular shape in front of it. The circle usually took the form of a rising sun, or an animated version of the Vitruvian Man. Discovery Channel's previous slogans had been "Explore Your World" and "There's No Thrill Like Discovery." Keeping with its changing focus away from strictly educational programming toward reality TV, the slogan was changed in the early 2000s to "Entertain Your Brain".

In 1995, the channel's name was simplified to "Discovery Channel", dropping "The" from its name. A globe became a permanent part of the logo, and an underline was added to the bottom of the logo

On March 31, 2008, Discovery unveiled a new logo, which took effect on-air on April 15, 2008 (coinciding with the fourth season premiere of Deadliest Catch). The new logo was designed by Viewpoint Creative, and integrated Discovery's long-time globe iconography into the "D" lettering of the wordmark, creating a monogram that was usable as a standalone icon. The launch was accompanied by a new advertising campaign, "The World is Just Awesome", which featured scenes of Discovery personalities singing an adapted version of the song "I Love the Mountains". Discovery Channel president John Ford explained that the campaign was intended to "showcase our earned place in the greater pop culture landscape".

In August 2013 (coinciding with Shark Week), the aforementioned monogram became the main on-air logo as part of a new imaging campaign, "Grab Life By the Globe", which was designed to emphasize the channel's current focus on personality-driven programming. The logo was portrayed in promos with visual effects relevant to their respective program.

On April 1, 2019, Discovery unveiled a new logo, maintaining a refreshed version of the previous globe and D monogram. The new branding is accompanied by another new imaging campaign, "The World is Ours", which features scenes of Discovery personalities singing the Blue Swede version of "Hooked on a Feeling". The static version of the globe icon uses a non-standard projection that shows all continents, reflecting Discovery's presence as an international brand.

== Related and international units ==
=== Related channel ===
==== Discovery en Español ====
Discovery en Español
- Country: United States
- Headquarters: Miami, Florida, United States

Programming
- Language: Spanish
- Picture format: 1080i HDTV (downscaled to letterboxed 480i for the SDTV feed)

Ownership
- Owner: Skydance Corporation
- Parent: Warner Bros. Discovery Networks
- Sister channels: CNN en Español; Cinemax; Discovery en Español; Discovery Familia; HBO Latino; MTV Tres

History
- Launched: 1998; 28 years ago

Links
- Website: discoveryenespañol.com

Availability

Streaming media
- YouTube TV: Internet Protocol television

Discovery en Español is an American pay television channel that was launched as the Spanish-language version of the Discovery Channel. It is operated by the Latin American division of Warner Bros. Discovery International in Miami, Florida.

As of February 2015, approximately 6,476,000 American households (5.6% of households with television) receive Discovery en Español.

=== International ===
Discovery Channel reaches 431 million homes in 170 countries. Discovery Communications currently offers 29 network brands in 33 languages. In a number of countries, Discovery's channels are available on digital satellite platforms with multiple language soundtracks or subtitles including Spanish, German, Russian, French, Czech, Hindi, Tamil, Telugu, Bengali, Dutch, Portuguese, Italian, Norwegian, Swedish, Danish, Finnish, Turkish, Greek, Polish, Hungarian, Romanian, Latvian, Arabic, Slovene, Estonian, Japanese, Korean and Serbian. In 2011, a separate Tamil-language channel was launched. In Bulgaria, Discovery has, since 2000–2001, displayed Bulgarian subtitles by all cable providers and since 2010 – with Bulgarian dubbing for some shows.

==== Australia and New Zealand ====
In Australia, the Discovery Channel is part of a six-channel package (not including timeshifts) on digital subscription television, available on Foxtel, Optus TV and AUSTAR.

In New Zealand, the Australian version of Discovery is broadcast on SKY Network Television.

==== Canada ====
The Canadian version of Discovery was established in 1995 by Labatt Communications, and before 2024 the channel was owned by joint venture of Bell Media and WBD.

The channel airs similar programming to its U.S. counterpart, but also airs domestically produced programs to comply with local broadcasting regulations (which, in the past, included the daily science newsmagazine Daily Planet cancelled in 2018). Some of its original series (such as, most prominently, How It's Made) have been picked up in the U.S. by Discovery's sister networks (such as Science Channel), but others have not necessarily aired on Discovery's networks. Since 2018, the channel has increasingly aired blocks of fiction programming with science- or technology-oriented themes.

In June 2024, Rogers Sports & Media announced that it had acquired the Canadian rights to all WBD factual and lifestyle brands beginning January 1, 2025, including Discovery Channel. Bell subsequently announced that it would enter into a licensing agreement with NBCUniversal for two of its Discovery-branded channels, with Discovery being relaunched as USA Network on January 1, 2025. A new iteration of Discovery owned by Rogers concurrently launched the same day.

==== India ====
Discovery Channel was launched in 1995 in India broadcasting originally in English and Hindi. In June 2010, a Bengali audio track was added to the channel as well as a Telugu track in October 21 of that same year. On August 15, 2011, a separate Tamil-language channel was launched with an estimate audience of 10 million households. Discovery recently launched Discovery Plus, a new streaming service for India priced at ₹300 per year, offering content in eight languages—English, Hindi, Tamil, Telugu, Malayalam, Kannada, Bengali and Marathi.

==== Europe ====
In the United Kingdom, Discovery Channel UK airs some common programs as the U.S. version, including MythBusters, American Chopper, How It's Made and Deadliest Catch. The channel is carried as a basic subscription channel on the SKYdigital satellite service and digital cable provider Virgin Media. Discovery UK also operates Discovery HD, Discovery Knowledge, Discovery Turbo, Discovery Science, Animal Planet, DMAX, Discovery Real Time, Discovery Home & Health, Discovery Travel & Leisure and Discovery Shed. Many of these channels also have timeshifted versions. In the Republic of Ireland, the UK version of Discovery Channel is available on most cable providers in that country, but with local advertisements.

In Germany, Austria and Switzerland, Discovery Channel is part of the Premiere digital network and supplies specific programs to other networks like ZDF and kabel eins. Discovery Communications is also owner of the documentary-channel XXP. The channel was bought in the spring of 2006 from its former shareholders Spiegel TV and "dctp". All programs are dubbed into German. The channel is now known as "DMAX", presumably to associate the channel with Discovery.

In the Netherlands, the Discovery Channel is included on most cable, IPTV and DVB-T providers. Nearly all of the programs are broadcast in their original language, but they are subtitled in Dutch as is the policy of all Dutch television stations. Some programs and most promotions and program announcements have a Dutch voice-over. In Flanders, the Dutch-speaking part of Belgium, a Flemish Discovery Channel launched (previously the Dutch version was available for IPTV, DVB-C and DVB-S) on cable (and digital) television on October 1, 2009.

In Italy, the Discovery Channel (and HD) is distributed via satellite by Sky Italia as part of the documentary pack. In addition, Italy has four Discovery-branded channels: Discovery Science, Discovery Real Time, Discovery Animal Planet and Discovery Travel and Living.

In Bulgaria, Czech Republic, Croatia, Hungary, Poland, Romania, Slovakia, Serbia and Slovenia, Discovery Channel is carried by most cable television and IPTV providers with all the content subtitled in the respective languages. Additionally, it is also available on digital satellite platforms in Czech Republic, Poland and Slovakia (sometimes requiring an additional fee). In Poland, nc+ broadcasts the programs dubbed in Polish and in original English. A few other channels from Discovery are also in offer, like Discovery Historia, launched in cooperation with Polish broadcaster TVN, which later ended.

In Spain, the channel shares a schedule and programs with Portugal and is available on most satellite and cable platforms, making it possible to broadcast both in Spanish and Portuguese. In Spain, all programs are dubbed; whereas in Portugal, most of them are subtitled. In addition, Portugal has three Discovery-branded channels: Discovery Turbo (focusing on motorsports), Discovery Science (focusing on science and technology) and Discovery Civilization (focusing on historical events). These channels follow the same model as the original Discovery Channel, except for the absence of advertising. Spanish advertisements are broadcast on the Portuguese feed, non-subtitled or dubbed.

==== Southeast Asia ====
In Southeast Asia, Discovery Channel is available on digital subscription television. Discovery Channel Asia still shows crime programs (such as Most Evil and The FBI Files). Many programs feature development and society in Asian countries, especially in India and China. Thailand, Malaysia and Singapore have other channels branched from the main Discovery Channel, including Discovery Turbo, Discovery Science, Discovery Home & Health and Discovery Travel & Living.

The Philippines has its own semifeed derived from the Southeast Asian channel, in which offers regional variations with local advertisements during the commercial breaks.

==== South Africa ====
In South Africa, Discovery Channel shares a schedule and programming with all of Africa, the Middle East and Turkey. Discovery Channel and sibling channels Discovery World, TLC, Investigation Discovery and Animal Planet are available on the DStv/Multichoice platform.

== Controversies ==
=== RFID ===
In August 2008, it was reported by The Consumerist that Discovery Channel had preempted an episode of MythBusters examining RFID security in regard to its implementation in credit cards before its original broadcast because the episode would upset credit card companies, who are major advertisers on Discovery Channel. It was later determined that the decision not to investigate the issue was made by Beyond Productions, the MythBusters production company, and was not made by Discovery Channel or their advertising department.

=== Enigmatic Malaysia ===
An ad promoting Enigmatic Malaysia, a special series on the network meant to highlight the cultural heritages of Malaysia, mistakenly featured Balinese Pendet dancers. This prompted outrage from Balinese dancers, who posted messages demanding that Malaysia apologize over the misinformation, which then sparked a series of street protests. Further demands were made from the local governments, cultural historians and the tourism ministry in Indonesia for Malaysia to clarify the situation. The Malaysian government reportedly offered an apology, which was rejected by the Indonesian tourism minister, since the apology was given informally by phone; the Indonesian tourism minister demanded a written apology to make it more accountable.

=== Shark Week ===
Shark Week, Discovery's annual shark-themed programming block, has been criticized for sensationalism and the promotion of junk science.

=== Romanian RCS&RDS ===
In November 2012, the Romanian RCS&RDS, the largest company of its kind on the internal market, interrupted its carriage of Discovery Communications channels, including Discovery Channel. The CEO of Discovery Communications Mark Hollinger sent an open letter in his attempt to counteract the action of RCS&RDS, attracting the attention to the negation of the alleged right of the viewer to choose the viewed channels. In turn, RCS&RDS issued a press statement accusing of hypocrisy Hollinger's discourse attentive at the needs of viewers and attracted attention to the fact that, during negotiations, the main preoccupations of the Discovery representatives was maintaining as high as possible tariffs and monetary gains".

After four years of absence, on December 30, 2016, the Discovery Channel and its sister channel TLC returned to the RCS&RDS CATV, IPTV and DTH networks.

=== Eaten Alive ===
Eaten Alive was a television program in which wildlife filmmaker Paul Rosolie was purportedly going to be "eaten alive" by an anaconda. It aired on December 7, 2014. When the special aired, the anaconda attacked Rosolie but did not swallow him, as its title had implied, prompting numerous complaints of a bait and switch.

=== World’s Ultimate Frontier ===
In February 2024, a group of US congressmen sent a letter to the CEO of Warner Bros. Discovery criticizing World's Ultimate Frontier, a joint production between Discovery and Chinese state media outlet China Global Television Network (CGTN), for "whitewashing genocide" of the Uyghurs in Xinjiang. They called on Discovery to "suspend this partnership with CGTN immediately and to abstain from entering into any similar partnership with any other agent of CCP influence."

== See also ==
- Discovery Kids
- Discovery Times Square Exposition
- List of documentary channels
