= Presbyterian worship =

Protestant denomination worship practices

Presbyterian worship documents worship practices in Presbyterian churches; in this case, the practices of the many churches descended from the Scottish Presbyterian church at the time of the Reformation.

== Theology of worship ==
Historically, the driving principle in the development of the standards of Presbyterian worship is the regulative principle of worship, which specifies that (in worship), what is not commanded is forbidden.

In addition to those detailed in the History section below, Presbyterians also historically have held the following Worship positions:

- Only two sacraments:
  - Baptism, in which they hold to the paedo-baptist (i.e. infant baptism as well as baptising unbaptised adults) and the Aspersion (sprinkling) or Affusion (pouring) positions, rather than the Immersion position (although Immersion is valid)
  - The Lord's Supper (also known as Communion or the Eucharist)

== History ==
=== Worship at the time of the Reformation ===
At the start of the Scottish Reformation in 1560 there was no Reformed standard for worship in Scotland, so the shape the Church initially took was dependent on local Protestant patrons.

Writing from exile in Geneva, John Knox described in detail what should be done at weekly worship in a 'Letter of Wholesome Councell' dated 1556. Protestant preachers fleeing Marian persecutions in England brought with them Edward VI's second Book of Common Prayer (of 1552), which was commended by the Lords of the Congregation. Knox too initially supported it (indeed reportedly, he had influenced aspects of it). However, before leaving Geneva and with the encouragement of John Calvin, he had written his own 'Book of Common Order' and it was this that was printed and approved by the General Assembly of 1562. Enlarged, it was reprinted with the Confession and the Psalms in metre in 1564, and it remained the standard until replaced with the Westminster Directory in 1643.

The Regulative principle of worship (see Theology of Worship, above) saw many of the previous practices (inherited from the Roman Catholic church) cast aside. Two major points which might be unusual by today's standards were:

- Exclusive psalmody: the doctrine that, in worship, only the Psalms (from the Bible) were to be sung; singing other words was only to be done outside the worship service
- A cappella singing: the doctrine that no instruments were to be used in worship other than the human voice

Both of these were introduced, at least partly, to prevent the singing of hymns to Mary and the Saints.

=== Introduction of Continuous Singing ===
In early times the common method of singing in Presbyterian worship, was lining out, where a precentor read or sang one line and the congregation repeated it after them. The Directory of Public Worship, says this:

That the whole congregation may join herein, every one that can read is to have a psalm book; and all others, not disabled by age or otherwise, are to be exhorted to learn to read. But for the present, where many in the congregation cannot read, it is convenient that the minister, or some other fit person appointed by him and the other ruling officers, do read the psalm, line by line, before the singing thereof.

It appears from the wording that this was a practical measure in 1650, not a doctrinal position. Lining out was used by other denominations as well for the practical reasons that many people were not sufficiently literate or because of a lack of hymnals.

From around 1720 onwards, many advocated the introduction of continuous (or regular) singing. Continuous singing was introduced into many Presbyterian churches worldwide, even those that consider themselves to be following the traditional Presbyterian line on worship; there are some, who still practise lining out, such as the Steelites.

=== Introduction of Hymns ===
In this context, "hymns" means hymns that are not part of the Bible; the word "hymn" is used in the Bible, but it is claimed by advocates of exclusive psalmody that this refers to a specific type of psalm.

After singing psalms for 200 years, in 1861 the Church of Scotland first formally adopted hymns, with the Free Church of Scotland doing the same in 1872. Hymns and other extra-biblical words are now widely used in Presbyterian circles; the details vary from denomination to denomination.

=== Introduction of Instruments ===
In the early nineteenth century, R. William Ritchie of St. Andrew's Church, Glasgow, attempted to introduce an organ into his church, but was informed by the Presbytery of Glasgow that "the use of organs in the public worship of God is contrary to the law of the land and constitution of our Established Church."

In 1863, Robert Lee introduced a harmonium into worship at Greyfriars Kirk, Edinburgh. Lee defended instrumental music at the 1864 General Assembly, who declared that "such innovations should only be put down when they interfered with the peace of the Church and harmony of congregations". A pipe organ was subsequently installed in Greyfriars, and first used in 1865.

== Present practice ==
Presbyterian churches practice worship the Triune God: Father, Son, and Holy Spirit. This occurs every Sunday (Lords Day). Other services often occur at other times of the week as well as meetings for prayer and Bible Study or simply mid week chapel with communion being served. Most mainline Presbyterians use hymns and with some additions to more modern worship songs being introduced or part of a blended service. Most modern day Presbyterians do not strictly sing Psalms as some once did. John Calvin in Geneva used biblical psalms almost exclusively in the Genevan Psalter, though it contained some gospel canticles and catechetical songs. This psalter was to become a prototype for Reformed worship, but Calvin did not have any objection to the use of original hymns in other churches, and he did not appeal to scripture in his preface to the psalter justifying his preference for the Psalms.[1]: 42, 45

Other Presbyterian denominations hold exclusively to the psalms in metre. The psalms in metre are still esteemed by worship leaders in the Church of Scotland while also recognizing the contribution of authors of hymns and worship songs from historic times to the contemporary. Use of contemporary worship songs is employed by some more independent or evangelical congregations within Presbyterianism.

John Calvin's direction for celebration of Holy Communion was every Lord's Day. During the time of the Puritan influence upon some Presbyterians, worship and the celebration of the Eucharist became lessened to once per quarter. This has changed in most mainline Presbyterian denominational churches and celebration of Communion ranges from once a quarter to once a month to every Sunday or Lord's Day Service. This movement is carried forward by those who believe that Word and Sacrament should be present in each service of worship. The Real Presence of Christ (spiritually) is highly viewed and understood. Presbyterians strongly disagree with simply the symbolic or memorial service as taught by many Anabaptists, but do not go as far as the sacramental union view of Lutherans. Presbyterians hold the "Spiritual Real Presence" of Christ in the sacrament of Communion. Today most mainline Presbyterian churches administer Communion by either passing the elements or by intinction.

Over subsequent centuries, many Presbyterian churches modified these prescriptions by introducing hymnody, instrumental accompaniment, and ceremonial vestments into worship. However, there is not one fixed "Presbyterian" worship style. Although there are set services for the Lord's Day in keeping with first-day Sabbatarianism,[24] one can find a service to be evangelical and even revivalist in tone (especially in some conservative denominations), or strongly liturgical, approximating the practices of Lutheranism or more of Anglicanism (especially where Scottish tradition is esteemed),[clarification needed] or semi-formal, allowing for a balance of hymns, preaching, and congregational participation (favored by probably most American Presbyterians).

Most Presbyterian churches follow the traditional liturgical year and observe the traditional holidays, holy seasons, such as Advent, Christmas, Ash Wednesday, Holy Week, Easter, Pentecost, etc. They also make use of the appropriate seasonal liturgical colors, etc. Many incorporate ancient liturgical prayers and responses into the communion services and follow a daily, seasonal, and festival lectionary. Other Presbyterians, however, such as the Reformed Presbyterians, would practice a cappella exclusive psalmody, as well as eschew the celebration of holy days.

Among the paleo-orthodox and emerging church movements in Protestant and evangelical churches, in which some Presbyterians are involved, clergy are moving away from the traditional black Geneva gown to such vestments as the alb and chasuble, but also cassock and surplice (typically a full-length Old English style surplice which resembles the Celtic alb, an ungirdled liturgical tunic of the old Gallican Rite), which some, particularly those identifying with the Liturgical Renewal Movement, hold to be more ancient and representative of a more ecumenical past.

Presbyterians admit the authority of the Presbytery or Synod over all worship services in order to ensure that the worship of God, Father Son and Holy Spirit, is carried on properly and regularly in each congregation within the 'bounds' (area of jurisdiction). This is done by the appointment of Ministers by the Presbytery, who can also dismiss (depose) the Ministers should their conduct of regular worship be unsatisfactory. In modern times an effective presbytery is a forum for discussing and disseminating approaches to worship, always recognizing the supreme authority of the Word of God (Old and New Testaments of the Bible).

In the Church of Scotland, the cancellation of any regular service of worship is a serious matter. Services are carried out even by small rural congregations in the most extreme weather and under conditions of power failure and other privations. Elders, teaching and ruling, make every effort to ensure continuity or worship in every parish of Scotland at the published times.

== See also ==
- Christian worship
