= Precentor =

Person who helps facilitate worship

A precentor is a person who helps facilitate worship. The details vary depending on the religion, denomination, and era in question. The Latin derivation is præcentor, from cantor, meaning "the one who sings before" (or alternatively, "first singer").

== Ancient precentors ==
The chief precentor was the highest position in many ancient Mesopotamian cities (see Music of Mesopotamia).

== Jewish precentors ==
Jewish precentors are song or prayer leaders, leading synagogue music. A Jewish precentor is typically called a hazzan or cantor. In the Middle Ages, women precentors leading prayers in the vaybershul (women's gallery) were known as firzogerin, farzangerin, foreleiner, zogerin, or zogerke.

== Christian precentors ==
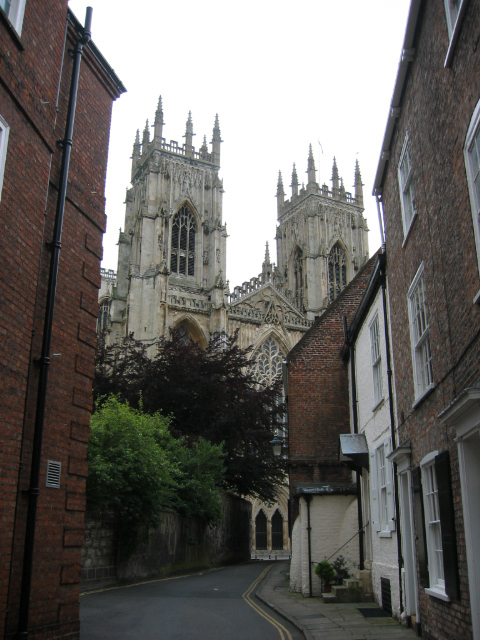
A view of York Minster from a street named Precentor's Court (2003)

A precentor is a member of a church who helps facilitate worship. The role of precentor was carried over from the synagogues into the early Christian church.

=== Catholic precentors ===
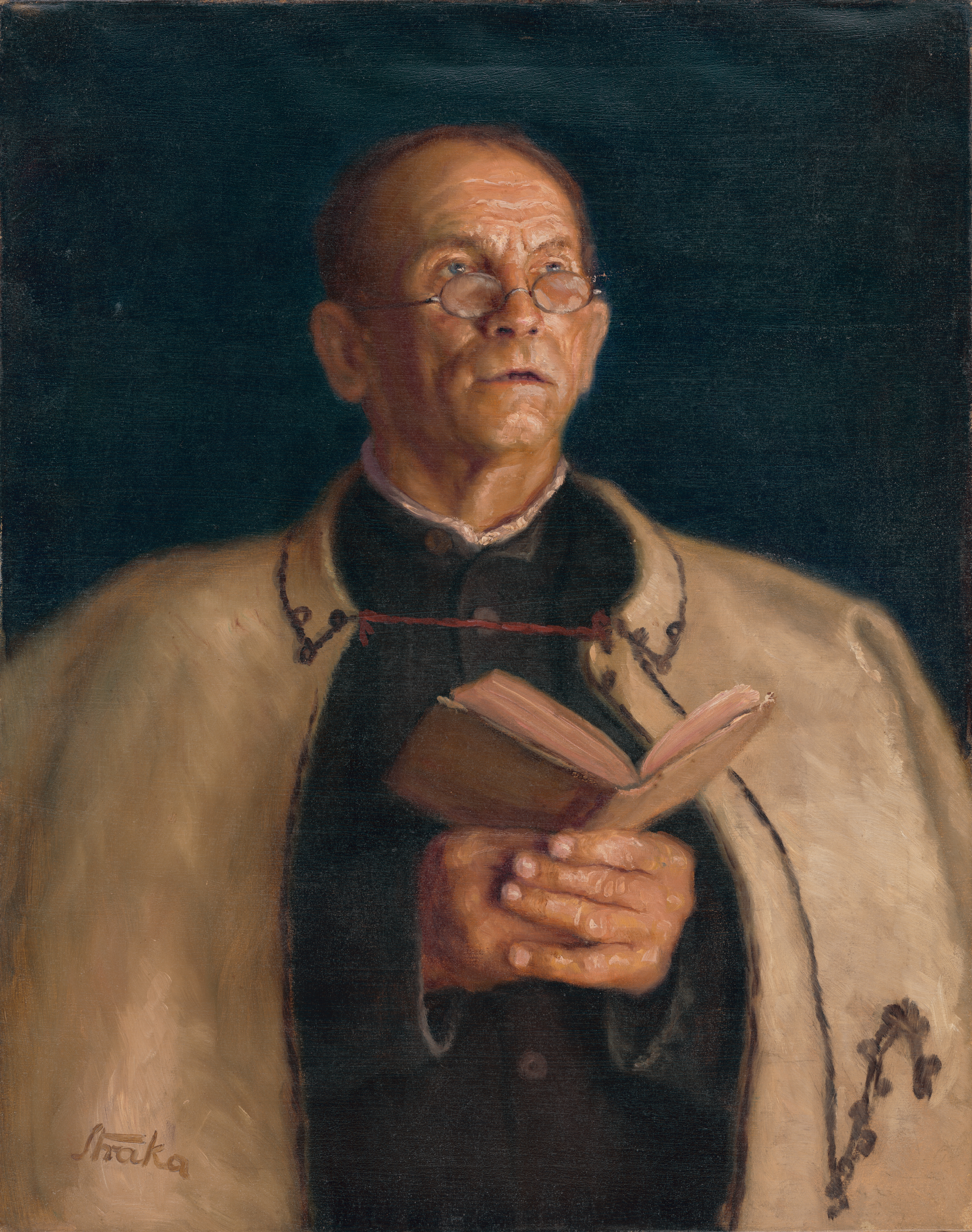
Painting of a Catholic precentor, by Štefan Straka, 1927

==== Ancient era ====
The term precentor usually described an ecclesiastical dignitary, an administrative or ceremonial officer. Anciently, the precentor had duties such as being the first or leading chanter, who on Sundays and greater feasts intoned certain antiphons, psalms, hymns, responsories, etc.; gave the pitch or tone to the bishop and dean at Mass (the succentor performing a similar office to the canons and clerks); recruited and taught the choir, directed its rehearsals and supervised its official functions; interpreted the rubrics and explained the ceremonies, ordered in a general way the Divine Office and sometimes composed desired hymns, sequences, and lessons of saints. He was variously styled capiscol (from the Latin caput scholæ, head of the choir-school), prior scholæ, magister scholæ, and primicerius (a word of widely different implications). Hugh of Saint Victor tells us that in the care of the primicerius were placed the acolytes, exorcists, lectors, and psalmists (chanters).

==== Middle Ages ====
In the Middle Ages the principal dignitaries of cathedral, collegiate chapters, and monastic orders, imitated the example of St. Gregory the Great in acting as directors of chant-schools. The schola was always in attendance when the bishop officiated in his cathedral, and to the precentor was assigned a place near the bishop and high in dignity. His office demanded much learning and executive ability, and his dignity corresponded with his duties.

In the cathedrals of England, France, Spain, and Germany, a precentor sometimes ranked next to the dean, sometimes next to the archdeacon. In some instances a precentor's sphere of activity was more broad, including the duty of installing deans, canons, and other dignitaries; and in some monasteries, the duties of librarian and registrar.

From the fourteenth century the title and dignity were largely handed over to incumbents whose musical knowledge did not fit them for the duties to which the name of precentor owed its origin; the dignities remained, but the duties became obscured. "In France, some chapters retain traces of the dignity of Precentor, and sometimes an archdeacon, sometimes a titular or honorary canon, carrying the baton cantoral, the insignia of his office". This "baton cantoral" is a silver or white staff. "In the dioceses of Aix, Carcassonne, Coutances, Dijon, Metz, Orléans, the dignity of Precentor is still the highest in the chapter.... Some chapters have sub-chanters, those of Arras being among the honorary resident canons", where also the quoted statutes of the Bishop of Dijon may serve to illustrate the modern idea of the office of precentor: "The Précenteur or Grand Chantre is the head of the choir and ... brings the antiphon to the bishop when officiating pontifically. Sacristans, chanters, choir-boys, and employés of the Cathedral are placed under his surveillance. He will also preserve order and silence in the sacristy."

=== Anglican precentors ===
A precentor is a person, usually ordained, who is in charge of preparing worship services. This position is usually held in a large church. Most cathedrals have a precentor in charge of the organisation of liturgy and worship. The precentor of a cathedral is usually a residentiary canon or prebendary and may be assisted by a succentor (particularly in the daily task of leading choral singing). In some cathedrals (including Canterbury), the precentor is a minor canon and therefore part of the foundation but not part of the chapter.

Traditionally the precentor's stall (seat) in the cathedral is on the opposite side of the quire from that of the dean, leading to the traditional division of the singers into decani (the dean's side) and cantoris (the precentor's side).

=== Presbyterian precentors ===
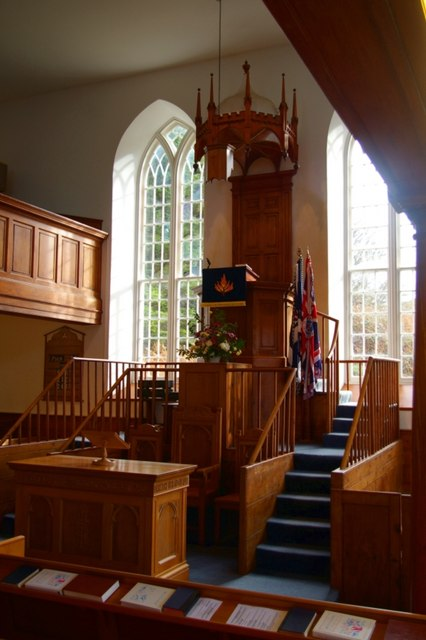
The pulpit and communion table from the Church of Scotland church in Duirinish, Skye. Between the two is the box for the precentor.

In Presbyterian churches that worship in the historical fashion (i.e., sing a cappella; see Presbyterian worship), a precentor is a person (man or woman, not necessarily clergy) who leads the singing, often by means of conducting techniques, but sometimes just by singing from amongst the congregation.

Churches that use a call and response method of singing called lining out (used primarily when sufficient numbers of psalm books are unavailable, or the congregation insufficiently literate, as was the case in the black church in Harper Lee's To Kill a Mockingbird) are usually led by the precentor, much as with other non-instrumental churches.

=== Public schools and Cambridge ===
The title "precentor" is also used at two English public schools, Radley College and Eton College, and a private school in Sri Lanka, S. Thomas' College, Mount Lavinia, to refer to the head of music. These school precentors have no specific religious duties although, as part of their musical function, they may conduct the college chapel choir. At Gonville and Caius College, Cambridge and Magdalene College, Cambridge, the precentor's main responsibility is as director of the college choir, which provides music for chapel services.
