= Foundation (evidence) =

Term in law

In common law, a foundation is sufficient preliminary evidence of the authenticity and relevance for the admission of material evidence in the form of exhibits or testimony of witnesses. Although the word "Foundation" does not appear in the Federal Rules of Evidence, scholars have argued that its existence is displayed, albeit implicitly, when viewing all the rules in context.

Material evidence is important evidence that may serve to determine the outcome of a case. Exhibits include real evidence, illustrative evidence, demonstrative evidence, and documentary evidence. The type of preliminary evidence necessary to lay the proper foundation depends on the form and type of material evidence offered. Further, a proper foundation must be laid with respect to witness testimony. The type of questioning and evidence necessary to properly lay a witness foundation differs based on what the witness is testifying to, and in what capacity they are testifying.

The lack of foundation is a valid objection that an adverse party may raise during trial.

== Relevance ==
The Federal Rules of Evidence states rules regarding a piece of evidence's relevancy and whether or not it is admissible. F.R.E. 402 states relevant evidence is admissible unless otherwise excluded by: "The U.S. Constitution, a federal statute, the Federal Rules of Evidence, or other rules proscribed by the Supreme Court." F.R.E. 402 further provides that irrelevant evidence is inadmissible.

=== Test for relevance ===
F.R.E. 401 outlines the test for whether or not evidence is relevant. The rule states: "Evidence is relevant if: (a) it has any tendency to make a fact more or less probable than it would be without the evidence; and (b) the fact is of consequence in determining the action."

In determining these two factors, courts question what issues are consequential in a particular case, and whether the evidence a party seeks to admit has any tendency to prove or disprove a fact at issue. This is called weighing the evidence's probative value, which is a term used to describe the amount which a fact either proves or disproves an issue. This process of testing evidence's probative value requires a process of legal analysis and reasoning.

Courts are extremely liberal when determining whether or not evidence is probative, erring on the side of admission rather than excluding evidence for being irrelevant. Evidence that is irrelevant is inadmissible in court according to F.R.E. 402.

=== Exclusion of relevant evidence ===
Evidence is not admissible just because it is relevant. For example, in a murder case where the victim was killed by a gunshot wound, evidence showing the Defendant owned guns is relevant; however, evidence that the defendant owned guns is inadmissible to show he is a "murderous criminal" without further evidence those weapons were brought to the scene of the crime. F.R.E. 403 lists some of the reasons that relevant evidence would be excluded. These reasons include: the likelihood of the jury becoming unduly prejudiced to a party, and a likelihood that the evidence will cause the jury to confuse the issues or be mislead, etc. Issues such as the evidence's prejudicial effect are balanced with how probative the evidence is. A court may exclude evidence if the issues it presents, such as prejudice, substantially outweigh the value of the evidence.

Another example of this balancing test is in Old Chief v United States. In Old Chief, the defendant was on trial for an altercation that resulted in him firing a weapon. The defendant had previously been convicted of a crime resulting in imprisonment for one year, which put him in violation of a statute prohibiting certain convicted felons from possessing guns. The defendant wished to stipulate he was a convicted felon and prevent the government from referencing the specifics of his prior conviction. The Court ruled that the specifics of his prior conviction were inadmissible, in part, due to F.R.E. 403, given the prejudice to the defendant would outweigh its probative value since the defendant already admitted he had previously been convicted of a crime.

=== Conclusion on relevance and foundation ===
As a preliminary matter, a lawyer must introduce sufficient facts to the court to suggest that the introduction of evidence will meet the standard set forth in F.R.E. 401. This may be done outside of the presence of the jury at a preliminary hearing. There, under relaxed evidentiary rules, attorneys present arguments to the court for or against the admissibility of evidence.

== Authentication ==
The Federal Rules of Evidence mandate that evidence be authentic in order to be introduced at trial. This means the proponent of evidence must "produce evidence sufficient to support a finding that the item is what the proponent claims it is."

For example, if the prosecution in a murder case wishes to present a photograph of the crime scene to the jury, they must verify that the photograph is an accurate representation of the what it is being offered to show (the murder scene). This may include facts with regards to: distances in the photograph, inaccuracies or distortions, the camera the photograph was taken with, the circumstances under which the photo was taken, etc.

=== Process of authenticating and admitting exhibits ===
There is a process attorneys must follow before being allowed to show evidence to the jury. First, the proponent of the evidence must request that the item be marked for identification. The proponent will then hand the item of evidence to the bailiff/court reporter who will mark it (ie.: Exhibit 1). After the item of evidence has been marked for purposes of identification, the attorney must then hand it to opposing counsel for inspection. Following opposing counsel's inspection, the proponent can then bring the item of evidence to the witness.

Once the item of evidence is with the witness, the proponent must lay sufficient foundation to establish the evidence's authenticity. The attorney must now elicit answers from the witness that establish the evidence is what is purports to be. Once a sufficient foundation has been laid, the proponent may ask the judge to move the item into evidence. The judge will then ask if there are any objections from opposing counsel, and make a determination as to whether or not the evidence will be admitted. If the judge rules to admit the evidence, it can then be shown to the jury.

== Witness testimony ==
Attorneys must lay a foundation for witness testimony at trial. The process differs when the witness is a lay witness or an expert witness. However, as a baseline matter for both expert and lay witnesses, the testimony must be established to be helpful in assisting the trier of fact understand a fact at issue in the case.

=== Lay witnesses ===
A lay witness is a non-expert who may only provide opinions based upon their own personal knowledge of particular facts at issue in a case. F.R.E. 602 provides the rule relating to the necessary foundation that must be laid for a witness to testify on a particular matter. The rule states that a sufficient amount of evidence must be proposed to show that the witness has personal knowledge of the matter.

Lawyers typically elicit the necessary information to establish a foundation for lay witnesses via targeted questions during testimony. For example, to establish a basis of a lay witness's personal opinion of a defendant, an attorney may ask the witness questions such as: whether they know the defendant? How do you know the defendant? How long have you known the defendant? These questions serve to establish the fact that the witness has developed their own perception of the defendant through their own experience.

=== Expert witnesses ===
An expert witness is a witness with a particular skillset and set of credentials that allows them to formulate a specialized opinion on an issue in a case. Expert witnesses may formulate and testify to opinions which lay witnesses would be disallowed to make. Further, unlike lay witnesses, expert witnesses do not need to have personally observed the facts at issue to make an opinion. However, F.R.E 703 mandates that the experts base their scientific findings on facts or data that another experts in the same field would reasonably rely upon to come to a determination.

Prior to the promulgation on F.R.E. 702, the standard for admissibility of expert opinion was guided by Daubert v Merrell Dow Pharmaceuticals, Inc. That standard, while superseded by 702, is still a valid challenge to expert testimony. The Daubert standard inquires: 1) whether the expert's scientific method has been subject to testing, 2) whether the method has undergone peer review and been published, 3) how fallible is the method, 4) whether the method is subject to particular standards when it is undertaken, 5) whether the method is accepted in the scientific community in which it is employed? If a combination of these factors are established following an objection by opposing counsel, the expert's opinion will be deemed admissible.
