= Trial graphics =

Images designed for use in legal trials

Trial graphics are images that have been designed by expert graphic artists for use in legal trials and procedures. Graphs and other images can be created to use as evidential support in a court of law by utilizing current graphic design technology.

Effective jury presentations are a key point to creating a strong legal case. High quality legal graphics are a relatively new tool that can be utilized by lawyers looking to add clear forms of analytic data or other designed images for jury review.
