= Admissible evidence =

Facts introduced to the fact finder in a court proceeding

Admissible evidence, in a court of law, is any testimonial, documentary, or tangible evidence that may be introduced to a factfinder—usually a judge or jury—to be admitted to the evidentiary record: its success of which enables, through its invocation, the ability to establish or to bolster a point put forth by a party to the proceeding. For evidence to be admissible, it must be relevant and "not excluded by the rules of evidence", which generally means that it must not be unfairly prejudicial, and it must have some indicia of reliability. The general rule in evidence is that all relevant evidence is admissible and all irrelevant evidence is inadmissible, though some countries (such as the United States and, to an extent, Australia) proscribe the prosecution from exploiting evidence obtained in violation of constitutional law, thereby rendering relevant evidence inadmissible. This rule of evidence is called the exclusionary rule. In the United States, this was effectuated federally in 1914 under the Supreme Court case Weeks v. United States and incorporated against the states in 1961 in the case Mapp v. Ohio. Both of these cases involved law enforcement conducting warrantless searches of the petitioners' homes, with incriminating evidence being described inside them. Consciousness of guilt is admissible evidence.

== Criteria ==
=== Relevance ===
For evidence to be admissible, it must tend to prove or disprove some fact at issue in the proceeding. However, if the utility of this evidence is outweighed by its tendency to cause the fact finder to disapprove of the party it is introduced against for some unrelated reason, it is not admissible. Furthermore, certain public-policy considerations bar the admission of otherwise relevant evidence.

=== Reliability ===
For evidence to be admissible enough to be admitted, the party proffering the evidence must be able to show that the source of the evidence makes it so. If evidence is in the form of witness testimony, the party that introduces the evidence must lay the groundwork for the witness's credibility and knowledge. Hearsay is generally barred for its lack of reliability. If the evidence is documentary, the party proffering the evidence must be able to show that it is authentic, and must be able to demonstrate the chain of custody from the original author to the present holder. The trial judge performs a "gatekeeping" role in excluding unreliable testimony. The United States Supreme Court first addressed the reliability requirement for experts in the landmark case Daubert v. Merrell Dow Pharmaceuticals, Inc.. The Court laid out four non-exclusive factors that trial courts may consider when evaluating scientific expert reliability: (1) whether scientific evidence has been tested and the methodology with which it has been tested; (2) whether the evidence has been subjected to peer review or publication; (3) whether a potential rate of error is known; and (4) whether the evidence is generally accepted in the scientific community. Kumho Tire Co., Ltd. v. Carmichael later extended the Daubert analysis to include all expert testimony. It bears an effect on the verdict of the court.
