= Best Evidence (TV series) =

2007 American documentary television series

Best Evidence is a documentary television series on the Discovery Channel and Discovery Times channel that began airing in January 2007. The series was produced by Phil Dejardins and Creative Differences Inc.

== Reception ==
Emily Ashby of Common Sense Media wrote that the series gives "an intriguing look at how scientific advances bring us closer to answering established mysteries", but "there are no definitive conclusions to be found here, which is both frustrating and thought-provoking". Erin McWhirter of The Daily Telegraph called the episode about the TWA Flight 800 explosion "informative and intriguing". In a review of the series' video publication, Louisville Eccentric Observer reviewers David B. King and Bill Raker said it "combines cutting-edge science, Fortean phenomena and conspiracy theory into a fun, spicy stew of bigfoots, deliberate plane crashes, near-death experiences and more".

== Episodes ==
1. "TWA Flight 800"
2. "Bigfoot"
3. "Chemical Contrails": Jet-aircraft vapor trails may be toxic.
4. "The Roswell Incident"
5. "John Wayne's Death"
6. "Cattle Mutilations"
7. "Near-Death Experiences"
8. "Alien Abductions"
9. "Crop Circles"
10. "The Visitors"
11. "Strange Encounters"
12. "The Government Cover Up"
13. "UFO Phenomenon"
14. "Government Cover-up"
