= Praise report =

In certain branches of Christianity, a praise report occurs when a believer shares with the congregation a positive happening that has transpired in his/her life that he/she attributes to God. The sharing of praise reports, prayer requests, and testimonies is a common practice in services of worship in the Baptist, Methodist (inclusive of the holiness movement), and Pentecostal traditions of Christianity. In The People Called Methodist, theologians William Benjamin Lawrence, Dennis M. Campbell, and Russell E. Richey define praise reports as "reports or events in people's lives to be celebrated". The Free Methodist Church notes that the praise reports are a testimony to the work of the Holy Spirit. A number of churches have online platforms through which the faithful can share prayer requests and praise reports online.

Christians of all denominations, such as Roman Catholics and Evangelical Lutherans, may share praise reports with one another or publish them for people to read.
