= Testimony =

Solemn attestation as to the truth of a matter

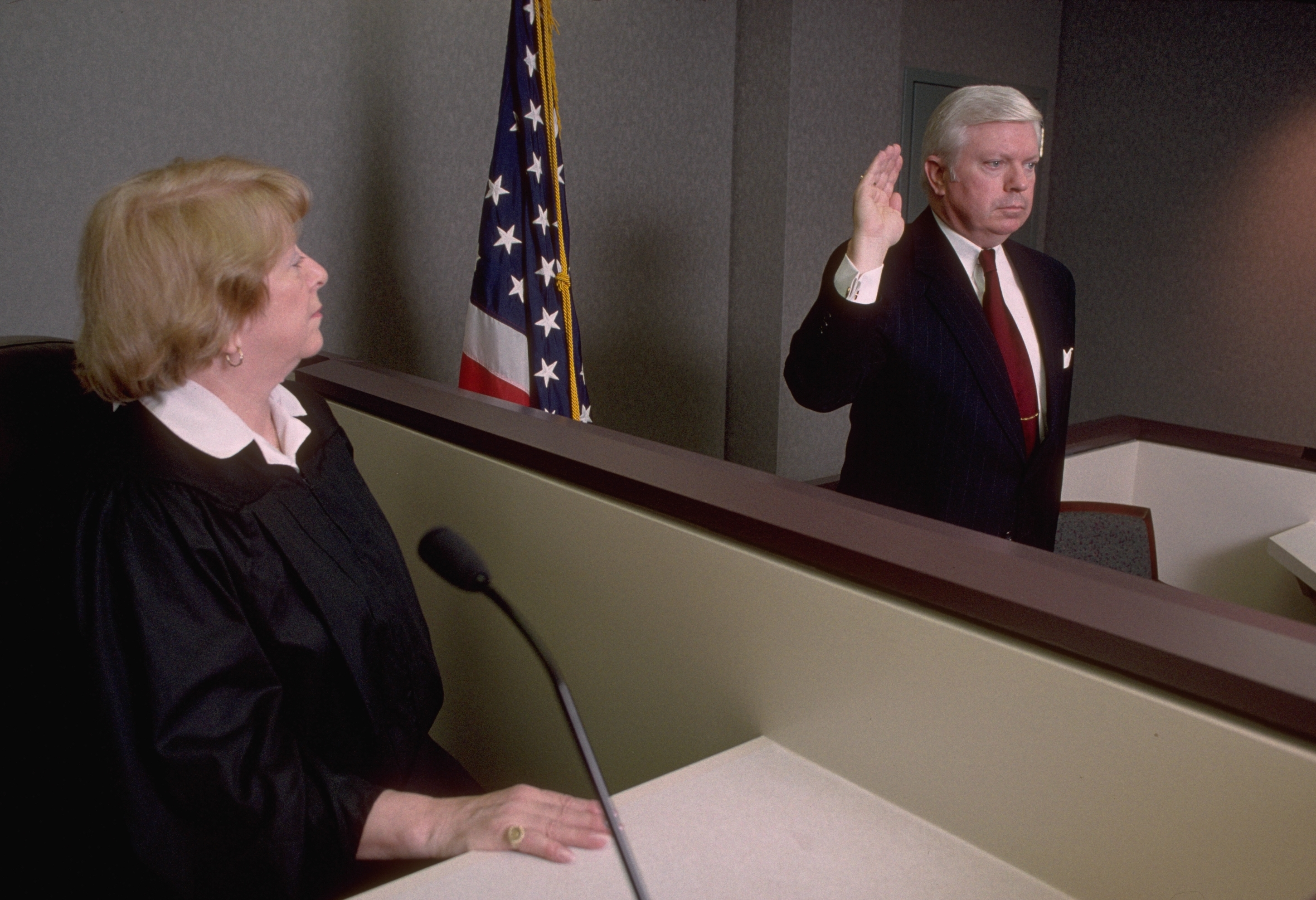
Testimonies are often given in courts of law.

Testimony is a solemn attestation as to the truth of a situation. It is a foundational form of evidence in almost all legal systems, as well as used in religious contexts as an obligation (such as the Shahada) or as an act of piety. When appearing in legal contexts, testimony can broadly be classified as lay or expert, and is subject to the rules of evidence of whatever jurisdiction it appears in.

== Etymology ==
The words testimony and testify both derive from the Latin word testis, referring to the notion of a disinterested third-party witness.

== Law ==
In the law, testimony is a form of evidence in which a witness makes a "solemn declaration or affirmation ... for the purpose of establishing or proving some fact". According to Bryan A. Garner, the editor of Black's Law Dictionary, the word "testimony" is properly used as a mass noun (that is, always uninflected regardless of number), and not a count noun.

Testimony may be oral or written, and it is usually made by oath or affirmation under penalty of perjury. Historically, to be admissible in court and to ensure maximum reliability and validity, written testimony presented in the form of an affidavit (i.e., the witness would not be appearing in court at the hearing at which the affidavit was considered as evidence) was usually witnessed by another person (in many common law jurisdictions, a notary public) who had to also swear to or affirm its authenticity, also under penalty of perjury. In 1976, the United States Congress enacted a statute allowing for the use of an unsworn declaration under penalty of perjury in lieu of an affidavit in federal courts. In other words, the declarant's signature together with a statement that they were making the unsworn declaration under penalty of perjury were deemed as a matter of law to be sufficiently solemn to remind the declarant of their duty to speak the truth, the whole truth, and nothing but the truth (meaning notarization was no longer required). As of 2006, about 20 states also had similar statutes allowing the use of unsworn declarations in their state courts.

Unless a witness is testifying as an expert witness, testimony in the form of opinions or inferences is generally limited to those opinions or inferences that are rationally based on the perceptions of the witness and are helpful to a clear understanding of the witness' testimony.

Legitimate expert witnesses with a genuine understanding of legal process and the inherent dangers of false or misleading testimony refrain from making statements of fact. They also recognize that they are in fact not witnesses to an alleged crime or other event in any way, shape or form. Their expertise is in the examination of evidence or relevant facts in the case. They should make no firm judgement or claim or accusation about any aspect of the case outside their narrow range of expertise. They also should not allege any fact they can not immediately and credibly prove scientifically.

For example, a hair sample from a crime scene entered as evidence by the prosecution should be described by an expert witness as "consistent with" a sample collected from the defendant, rather than being described as a "match". A wide range of factors make it physically impossible to prove for certain that two hair or tissue samples came from a common source.

Having not actually witnessed the defendant at the scene, the expert witness can not state for a fact that the sample is a match to the defendant, particularly when the samples were collected at different times and different places by different collectors using different collection methods. Ultimately, the testimony of expert witnesses is regarded as supportive of evidence rather than evidence in and of itself, and a good defense attorney will point out that the expert witness is not in fact a witness to anything, but rather an observer.

When a witness is asked a question, the opposing attorney can raise an objection, which is a legal move to disallow or prevent an improper question to others, preferably before the witness answers, and mentioning one of the standard reasons, including:

- argumentative
- asked and answered
- best evidence rule
- calls for speculation
- calls for a conclusion
- compound question or narrative
- hearsay
- inflammatory
- incompetent witness (e.g., child, mental or physical impairment, intoxicated)
- irrelevant, immaterial (the words "irrelevant" and "immaterial" have the same meaning under the Federal Rules of Evidence. Historically, irrelevant evidence referred to evidence that has no probative value, i.e., does not tend to prove any fact. Immaterial refers to evidence that is probative, but not as to any fact material to the case. See Black's Law Dictionary, 7th Ed.).
- lack of foundation
- leading question
- privilege
- vague
- ultimate issue testimony

There may also be an objection to the answer, including:

- non-responsive

Up until the mid-20th century, in much of the United States, an attorney often had to follow an objection with an exception to preserve the issue for appeal. If an attorney failed to "take an exception" immediately after the court's ruling on the objection, he waived his client's right to appeal the issue. Exceptions have since been abolished, due to the widespread recognition that forcing lawyers to take them was a waste of time.

When a party uses the testimony of a witness to show proof, the opposing party often attempts to impeach the witness. This may be done using cross-examination, calling into question the witness's competence, or by attacking the character or habit of the witness. So, for example, if a witness testifies that he remembers seeing a person at 2:00 pm on a Tuesday and his habit is to be at his desk job on Tuesday, then the opposing party would try to impeach his testimony related to that event.

== Government ==
Testimony is given by those invited or compelled to speak at, or submit a written statement to, legislative hearings such as United States congressional hearings.

Testimony may also be given to a regulatory agency as part of the process of making or changing regulations.

== Religion ==
Christians in general, especially within the Evangelical tradition, use the term "to testify" or "to give one's testimony" to mean "to tell the story of how one became a Christian". Commonly it may refer to a specific event in a Christian's life in which God did something deemed particularly worth sharing. Christians often give their testimony at their own baptism, church services, and at evangelistic events. Many Christians have also published their testimony on the internet.

=== New Testament ===
After the early church began to preach about the death and resurrection of Jesus Christ, Peter and the other apostles asserted that "we are witnesses of these things". Pope Francis has commented on Peter being "strong in his testimony", describing "testimony" as the "lifeblood" of the church.

=== Types ===
In addition to emphasizing faith and holiness, Methodism holds that "Scripture does teach the necessity of confession of sins (1 Jn 1:0), repentance (Luk 13:3,5. Ac 2:38, Ac 3:19, 2 Co 7:10, 2 Pe 3:9), and a testimony that one has chosen to follow Christ (Ro 10:9-10)." Methodist churches in the holiness tradition devote a portion of their Sunday evening service and/or mid-week Wednesday evening service of worship to allow members to give a personal testimony about their faith and experiences in living the Christian life (in addition to sharing prayer requests and praise reports):

203. What do we mean by testimony?

By testimony we usually mean witnessing before others to the fact that God has forgiven our sins.
204. Who is benefited by testimony?
A testimony will help the one who makes it—it will strengthen his faith. It is also an encouragement to those who hear.
205. What does the Bible say about testimony?
"With the heart man believeth unto righteousness; and with the mouth confession is made unto salvation" (Rom. 10:10).

"And they overcame him by the blood of the Lamb, and by the word of their testimony" (Rev. 12:11). —Catechism of the Pillar of Fire Church

In the Religious Society of Friends, the word testimony is used to refer to the ways in which Friends testify or bear witness to their beliefs in their everyday lives. In this context, the word testimony refers not to the underlying belief, but the committed action which arises out of their beliefs, which testifies to their beliefs. Common areas in which modern Friends are said to testify include testimony towards peace, testimony to simplicity, testimony to truth and integrity, and testimony to equality.

In some religions (most notably Mormonism and Islam) many adherents testify as a profession of their faith, often to a congregation of believers. In Mormonism, testifying is also referred to as "bearing one's testimony", and often involves the sharing of personal experience—ranging from a simple anecdote to an account of personal revelation—followed by a statement of belief that has been confirmed by this experience. Within Mormon culture, the word "testimony" has become synonymous with "belief". Although "testimony" and "belief" are often used interchangeably, they are inherently different. Most Mormons believe that when faith is acted upon, individuals can receive a spiritual witness which solidifies belief into testimony; that if the exercise of faith leads to good works, they can know their religious principles are true. An individual who no longer believes in the religion may be referred to as having "lost their testimony".

== Large-group awareness training ==
In the context of large-group awareness training, anecdotal testimony may operate in the forms of "sharing" or delivering a "share".

== Literature ==
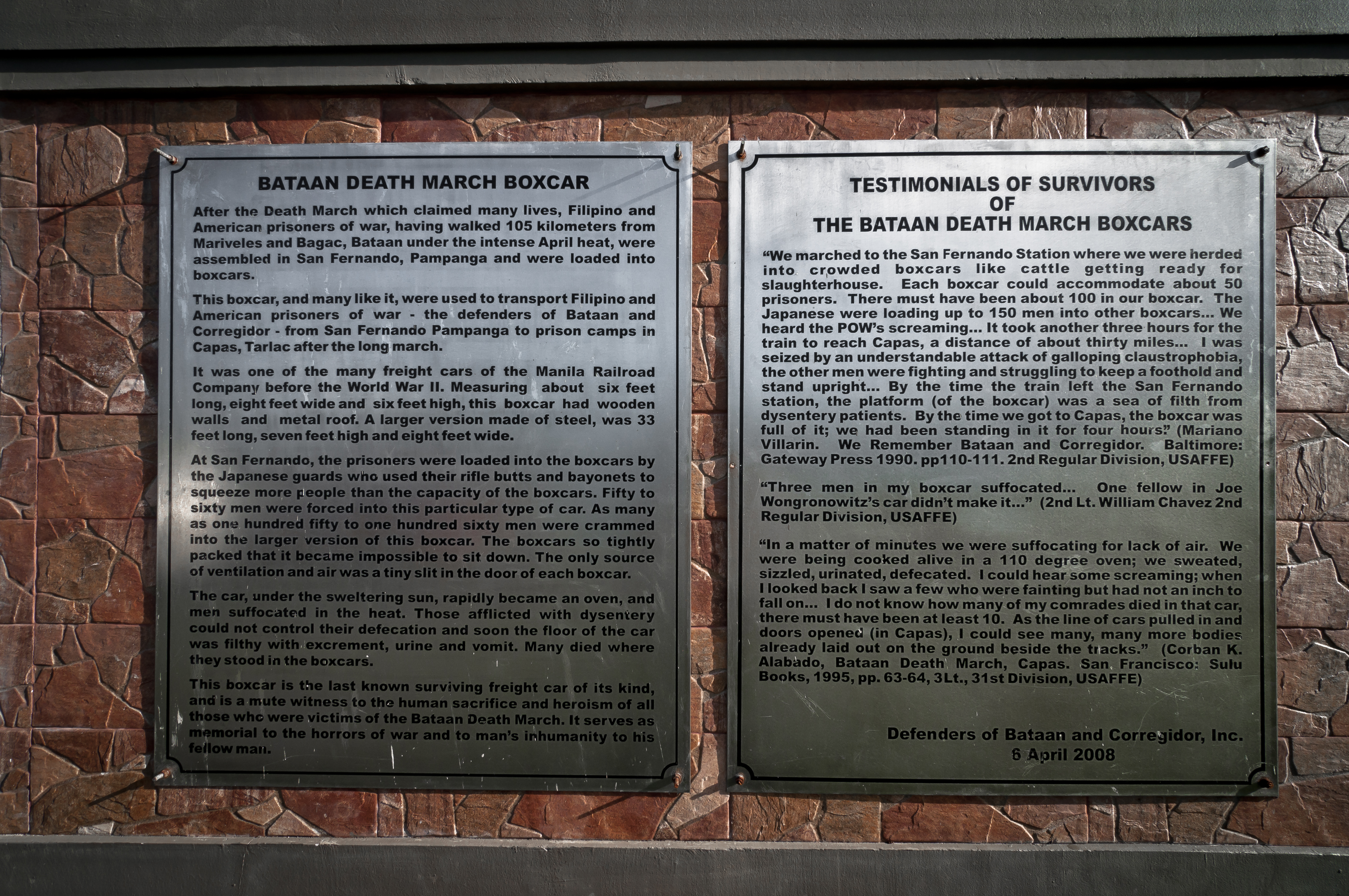
Bataan Death March Testimonials

Some published oral or written autobiographical narratives are considered "testimonial literature".

== Philosophy ==
In philosophy, testimony is a proposition conveyed by one entity (person or group) to another entity, whether through speech or writing or through facial expression, that is based on the entity's knowledge base. The proposition believed on the basis of a testimony is justified if conditions are met which assess, among other things, the speaker's reliability (whether her testimony is true often) and the hearer's possession of positive reasons (for instance, that the speaker is unbiased).

We can also rationally accept a claim on the basis of another person's testimony unless at least one of the following is found to be true:

1. The claim is implausible;
2. The person or the source in which the claim is quoted lacks credibility;
3. The claim goes beyond what the person could know from their own experience and competence.

== See also ==
- Bayesian epistemology
- Daubert standard
- Deposition
- Eyewitness memory
- Direct examination
- Hostile witness
- In limine
- Leading question
- Praise report
- Prayer request
- Redirect examination
- Rashomon effect
- Strike from the record
- Testimony in Jewish law
- Testimony of peace
