= Best evidence rule =

Common law rule of evidence

The best evidence rule is a legal principle that holds an original of a document as superior evidence. The rule specifies that secondary evidence, such as a copy or facsimile, will be not admissible if an original document exists and can be obtained. The rule has its roots in 18th-century British law, at a time when copies would be rewritten by hand and hence more vulnerable to inaccuracies.

== History and description ==
The best evidence rule has its origins in the 18th century case Omychund v Barker (1780) 1 Atk, 21, 49; 26 ER 15, 33. Wherein Lord Harwicke stated that no evidence was admissible unless it was "the best that the nature of the case will allow."

According to Blackstone's Criminal Practice, the best evidence rule in England and Wales, as used in earlier centuries, "is now all but defunct." Lord Denning MR said that "nowadays we do not confine ourselves to the best evidence. We admit all relevant evidence. The goodness or badness of it goes only to weight and not to admissibility."

In the United States, the best evidence rule is part of Article X of the Federal Rules of Evidence (Rules 1001-1008). The rule specifies the guidelines under which a party may request that it be allowed to submit into evidence a copy of the contents of a document, recording or photograph at a trial when the "original document is not available." If the party is able to provide an acceptable reason for the absence of the original, then "secondary evidence" or copies of the original document can be admitted as evidence. The best evidence rule is only applied in situations where a party attempts to substantiate a non-original document submitted as evidence during a trial. Admissibility of documents before state court systems may vary.

In Australia, the rule was effectively abolished with the 1995 enactment of the Uniform Evidence Law. Section 51 provides: "The principles and rules of the common law that relate to the means of proving the contents of documents are abolished."

== See also ==
- Digital evidence § Best evidence rule
