= Caterpillar Inc. v. Lewis =

- Supreme Court of the United States

Argued November 12, 1996 Decided December 10, 1996
- Full case name: Caterpillar, Inc. v. James David Lewis
- Citations: 519 U.S. 61 (more) 117 S. Ct. 467; 136 L. Ed. 2d 437

Case history
- Prior: Judgment for Caterpillar entered in the United States District Court for the Eastern District of Kentucky, and then vacated by the Sixth Circuit, 68 F.3d 474 (6th Cir. 1995). Certiorari granted, 517 U.S. 1133 (1996).

Holding
- If a case is improperly removed to federal court purportedly under diversity of citizenship, and the district court fails to remand the case back to state court, it does not lack jurisdiction to try the case if, at the time judgment is entered, complete diversity exists between the parties.

Court membership
- Chief Justice William Rehnquist Associate Justices John P. Stevens · Sandra Day O'Connor; Antonin Scalia · Anthony Kennedy; David Souter · Clarence Thomas; Ruth Bader Ginsburg · Stephen Breyer

Case opinion
- Majority: Ginsburg, joined by unanimous

Laws applied
- U.S. Const. art. III; 28 U.S.C. § 1332; 28 U.S.C. § 1446(b)

Caterpillar Inc. v. Lewis, 519 U.S. 61 (1996), held that federal jurisdiction predicated on diversity of citizenship can be sustained even if there did not exist complete diversity at the time of removal to federal court, so long as complete diversity exists at the time the district court enters judgment.

== Facts ==
James David Lewis, a resident of Kentucky, sustained injuries while operating a bulldozer. He filed suit in a Kentucky state court, alleging state-law product liability claims of defective manufacture, negligent manufacture, failure to warn, and breach of warranty. Lewis named as defendants Caterpillar and Whayne Supply Company. Caterpillar is a Delaware corporation with its principal place of business in Illinois. Whayne Supply Company, the company that sold the bulldozer, was a Kentucky corporation with its principal place of business in Kentucky. Later, the insurance company for Lewis's employer, Liberty Mutual Insurance Group, intervened as a plaintiff and made its own claims against Caterpillar and Whayne Supply. Liberty Mutual is a Massachusetts corporation with its principal place of business in Massachusetts.

Lewis settled his claim against Whayne Supply, which led Caterpillar to seek to remove the case to federal court. Lewis opposed this effort, arguing that complete diversity did not exist between all plaintiffs and all defendants because Liberty Mutual had not settled its claims against Whayne Supply. The district court ignored Lewis's argument, and allowed the removal because it believed that the fact that Lewis had settled his claim with Whayne Supply was sufficient to create the diversity necessary for federal jurisdiction.

The case proceeded through the discovery phase, during which Liberty Mutual settled with Whayne Supply. This settlement left Caterpillar as the only defendant in the case, such that all plaintiffs were citizens of different states than all defendants. After a six-day jury trial, the district court entered judgment for Caterpillar. Lewis appealed, and the Sixth Circuit vacated the judgment. It believed that diversity did not exist because, at the time of removal, a resident of Kentucky (Lewis) was a plaintiff and another resident of Kentucky (Whayne Supply) was still a defendant, although there was no claim between these two. For this reason, the Sixth Circuit reasoned, the district court lacked jurisdiction to hear the case. Caterpillar asked the Supreme Court to review the case, stressing that at the time judgment was entered, the jurisdictional defect that had existed at the beginning had been cured. The Supreme Court agreed to hear the case.

== Decision of the court ==
Article III allows federal courts to hear disputes between citizens of different states, but the Court has long interpreted the enabling statute whereby Congress exercised the right to confer this power as requiring that there be "complete diversity" of citizenship before federal courts may hear cases predicated on diversity jurisdiction. See 28 U.S.C. § 1332, Exxon-Mobil v. Allapattah Servs., and Strawbridge v. Curtiss. "Complete diversity" means that all plaintiffs must be citizens of different states than all defendants; in the case of corporate parties, their states of incorporation and places of business are both relevant. Under federal statute, diversity must exist at the time of removal and thereafter. In this case, both sides agreed that the district court did not correctly determine that the diversity requirement was satisfied at the time of removal and that the Sixth Circuit correctly identified this defect. Both sides also agreed that complete diversity did exist at the time of judgment. "Does the District Court's initial misjudgment still burden and run with the case, or is it overcome by the eventual dismissal of the nondiverse defendant?"

The Court ruled that because subject-matter jurisdiction existed at the time of judgment, the jurisdictional defect had been cured, and the Sixth Circuit erred in ruling otherwise. But Lewis had preserved his objection to federal jurisdiction by filing a motion to remand the case to state court and then by raising the issue on appeal. Shouldn't the plaintiff be rewarded for his diligent effort to preserve his choice to try the case in state court? Lewis argued that to allow Caterpillar to benefit from the district court's mistake would encourage defendants to seek removal more often in the hopes that the district court will make a mistake they might exploit. "These arguments are hardly meritless but they run up against an overriding consideration. Once a diversity case has been tried in federal court, with rules of decision supplied by state law under the regime of Erie Railroad Co. v. Tompkins, considerations of finality, efficiency, and economy become overwhelming." If the Court were to require that a case that had proceeded through trial to judgment had to be dismissed afterward for lack of jurisdiction, there would be a tremendous waste of judicial resources. In this case, complete diversity, and hence federal jurisdiction, existed at the time of judgment. "To wipe out the adjudication postjudgment, and return to state court a case now satisfying all federal jurisdictional requirements, would impose an exorbitant cost on our dual court system, a cost incompatible with the fair and unprotracted administration of justice." Furthermore, the Court did not foresee that premature removal requests would prove to be the temptation Lewis envisioned. Instead, the Court trusted district courts to apply the removal rules properly, and observed that the fear of irritating district judges would deter defendants from filing frivolous removal requests.
