= Dart Cherokee Basin Operating Co. v. Owens =

- Supreme Court of the United States

Argued October 7, 2014 Decided December 15, 2014
- Full case name: Dart Cherokee Basin Operating Company, LLC, et al., Petitioners v. Brandon W. Owens
- Docket no.: 13-719
- Citations: 574 U.S. 81 (more) 135 S. Ct. 547; 190 L. Ed. 2d 495; 2014 U.S. LEXIS 8435; 83 U.S.L.W. 4029; 25 Fla. L. Weekly Fed. S 15

Case history
- Prior: On writ of certiorari to the United States Court of Appeals for the Tenth Circuit, Dart Cherokee Basin Operating, Co., LLC v. Owens, 2013 U.S. App. LEXIS 26133 (10th Cir., June 20, 2013)

Holding
- A defendant's notice of removal need not include evidence of the amount in controversy, unless the plaintiff or the court challenges the defendant's allegations.

Court membership
- Chief Justice John Roberts Associate Justices Antonin Scalia · Anthony Kennedy; Clarence Thomas · Ruth Bader Ginsburg; Stephen Breyer · Samuel Alito; Sonia Sotomayor · Elena Kagan

Case opinions
- Majority: Ginsburg, joined by Roberts, Breyer, Alito, Sotomayor
- Dissent: Scalia, joined by Kennedy, Kagan; Thomas (all but final sentence)
- Dissent: Thomas

Laws applied
- 28 U.S.C. §1446

Dart Cherokee Basin Operating Co. v. Owens, 574 U.S. 81 (2015), was a case in which the Supreme Court of the United States clarified procedures for removing a class action lawsuit from state court to federal court. The case involved a dispute about revenue from oil and gas leases in which the defendant filed a motion to remove the case from a state court in Kansas to the United States District Court for the District of Kansas. However, the plaintiff argued that the defendant's motion was defective because the defendant's notice of removal did not include evidence demonstrating that the amount in controversy satisfied the jurisdictional threshold. The United States District Court for the District of Kansas ultimately ruled the case should be returned to the state court, and the United States Court of Appeals for the Tenth Circuit declined to review the district court's decision.

Writing for a majority of the Court, Justice Ruth Bader Ginsburg held that the defendant's notice of removal did not need to contain evidence of the amount in controversy because congress intended for courts to "apply the same liberal rules [to removal allegations] that are applied to other matters of pleading". Justice Ginsburg also held that the Tenth Circuit abused its discretion by declining to review the district court's ruling. Justice Antonin Scalia wrote a dissenting opinion in which he argued the Court should dismiss the case as improvidently granted because the Court had "no basis" to determine whether the Tenth Circuit denied review for an impermissible reason. Justice Clarence Thomas also filed a separate dissenting opinion in which he argued the Supreme Court lacked jurisdiction to review the Tenth Circuit's ruling because the decision to deny review was not a "case". Although some commentators expressed concern that the Court's ruling would cause "damage to the law of review", others described it as a victory for attorneys who defend against class actions.

== Background ==
=== Removal jurisdiction in federal courts ===
Title 28 of the United States Code outlines procedures for transferring a case from state court to federal court. When a defendant files a motion to remove a case from a state court to a federal court, the defendant must file a notice of removal that contains "a short and plain statement of the grounds for removal". If a defendant wishes to remove a case on the basis of diversity jurisdiction, the amount in controversy must be in excess of $5 million for class actions or $75,000 for all other cases. Additionally, the Class Action Fairness Act of 2005 (CAFA) allows litigants in a class action "to remove to federal court any sizable class action involving minimal diversity of citizenship" in accordance with the provisions set forth in 28 U.S.C. § 1446. If the plaintiff's complaint specifies monetary damages, those damages are "deemed to be the amount in controversy", as long as they are asserted in good faith. If the complaint does not specify monetary damages, then the defendant may specify the amount in controversy in their notice of removal.

=== Initial lawsuit ===
Brandon W. Owens filed a class action in the district court for Wilson County, Kansas to recover royalties that he claimed were owed to members of the class by Dart Cherokee Basin Operating Company, LLC, and Cherokee Basin Pipeline, LLC for oil and gas leases. Although he did not specify damages in his complaint, Owens requested "a fair and reasonable amount" to compensate the class for the alleged underpayments. The defendants then filed a motion to remove the case to federal district court, in which they stated the "purported underpayments to putative class members totaled more than $8.2 million". In response, Owens filed a motion to return the case to the Kansas state court on the grounds that the defendants produced "no evidence" to prove the amount in controversy was actually over the $5 million threshold. To support their motion, the defendants submitted a deceleration by one of their executive officers that indicated the amount in controversy was over $11 million, but Owens argued this declaration came too late and that deficient notice of removal "could not be cured by post-removal evidence about the amount in controversy". The United States District Court for the District of Kansas ruled the case should be returned to the state court, citing circuit precedent that held "factual allegations or evidence outside of the petition and notice of removal is not permitted to determine the amount in controversy".

=== Appeal to the Tenth Circuit ===
Although orders returning cases to state courts usually cannot be reviewed on appeal, federal circuit courts of appeals may consider appeals involving the Class Action Fairness Act. Dart Cherokee filed a petition for review pursuant to this exception in United States Court of Appeals for the Tenth Circuit, but the Tenth Circuit denied their petition. Dart Cherokee then filed a petition for en banc review, but a divided panel of Tenth Circuit judges denied Dart Cherokee's petition. Judge Harris Hartz filed an opinion dissenting from denial of review en banc, in which he argued the Tenth Circuit's requirements for notices of removal were "even more onerous than the code pleading requirements that I had thought the federal courts abandoned long ago". Judge Hartz concluded the Tenth Circuit had an "obligation" to grant review en banc "to provide clarity in this important area of the law". After the Tenth Circuit denied review en banc, Dart Cherokee filed a petition for certiorari in the Supreme Court of the United States, which was granted on April 7, 2014. The Supreme Court later stated that the Court granted certiorari to resolve a circuit split.

== Opinion of the Court ==
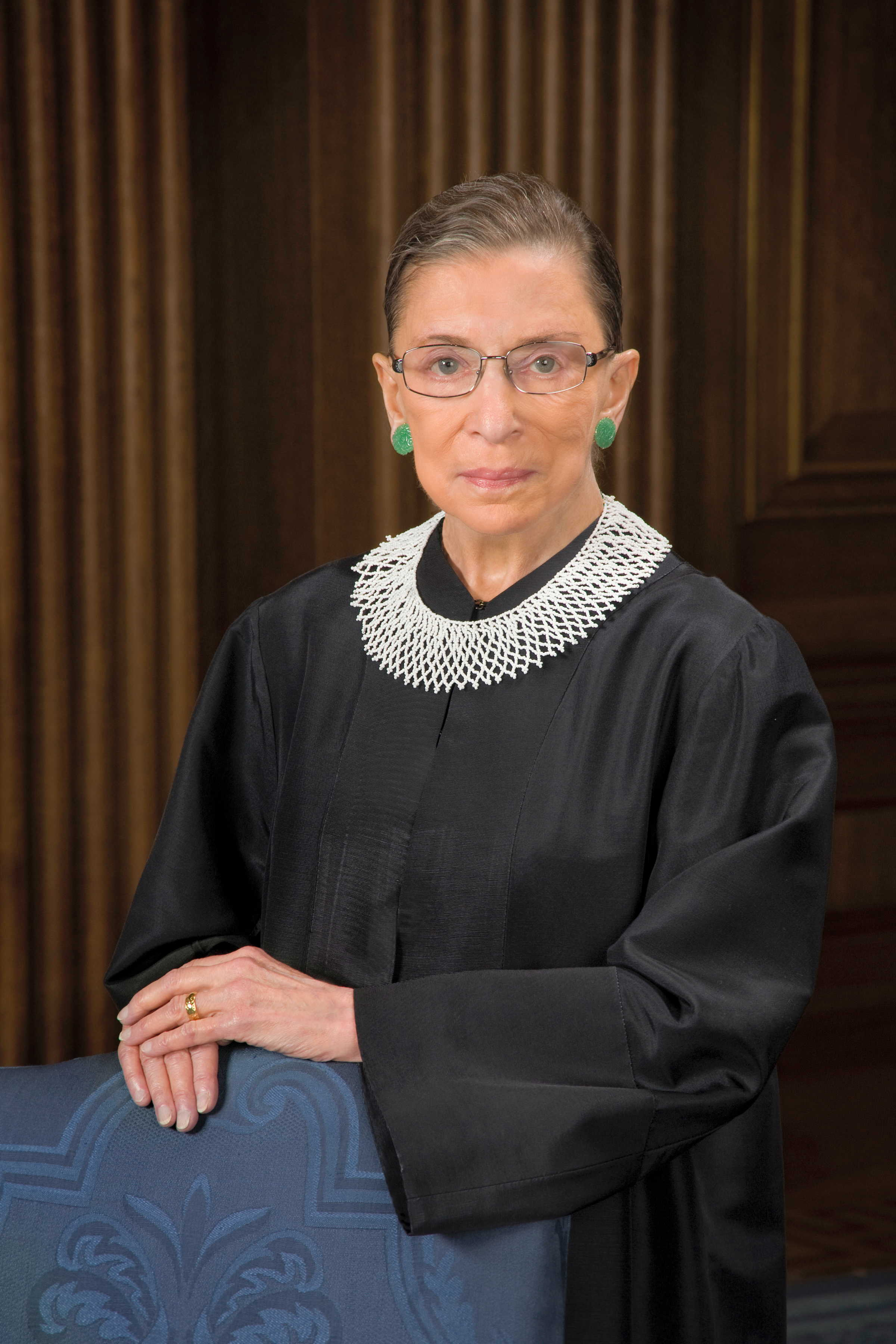
In her majority opinion, Justice Ruth Bader Ginsburg (pictured) held that evidence of the amount in controversy only needs to be included in a defendant's notice of removal when the plaintiff or the court challenges the defendant's allegations.

Writing for a majority of the Court, Justice Ruth Bader Ginsburg held that a "short and plain" statement in a notice of removal need not contain evidentiary submissions. Justice Ginsburg stated that the notice requirements in 28 U.S.C. § 1446 are modeled after the general pleading requirements in Rule 8(a) of the Federal Rules of Civil Procedure, and that congress intended for courts to "apply the same liberal rules [to removal allegations] that are applied to other matters of pleading". Because a plaintiff's "amount-in-controversy allegation is accepted if made in good faith," Justice Ginsburg argued that "when a defendant seeks federal-court adjudication, the defendant’s amount-in-controversy allegation should be accepted when not contested by the plaintiff or questioned by the court". Justice Ginsburg also noted that 28 U.S.C. § 1446 includes procedures for resolving disputes about amounts in controversy, but those procedures are only available "after the defendant files a notice of removal". Although Justice Ginsburg declined to consider whether a "presumption" against removal is proper in "mine-run diversity cases", Justice Ginsburg observed that "no antiremoval presumption attends cases invoking CAFA, which Congress enacted to facilitate adjudication of certain class actions in federal court". Therefore, Justice Ginsburg Concluded that evidence of the amount in controversy only needs to be included in a defendant's notice of removal when the plaintiff or the court challenges the defendant's allegations.

Justice Ginsburg also responded to an amicus brief filed by Public Citizen, Inc., which argued that the Tenth Circuit acted within its discretion when it decided to decline review because 28 U.S.C. § 1453(c)(1) states that "a court of appeals may accept an appeal from an order of a district court granting or denying a motion to remand a class action to the State court from which it was removed". She concluded that there was "no jurisdictional barrier to our settlement of the question presented". Justice Ginsburg emphasized that Tenth Circuit's decision to deny Dart Cherokee's petition to review the remand order "was infected by legal error". Because the Tenth Circuit "froze the governing rule in the Circuit for this case and future CAFA removal notices" and denied Dart Cherokee the opportunity to "resist making the evidentiary submission", Justice Ginsburg held the Tenth Circuit's abused its decision by denying review. Justice Ginsburg concluded by stating that the Supreme Court "no doubt [has] authority to review for abuse of discretion the Tenth Circuit’s denial of Dart’s appeal from the District Court’s remand order".

=== Justice Scalia's dissenting opinion ===
Justice Antonin Scalia wrote a dissenting opinion in which he was joined by Justice Anthony Kennedy and Justice Elena Kagan. Justice Clarence Thomas also joined all but the last sentence of the opinion. Although Justice Scalia recognized that the Supreme Court granted certiorari to decide whether notices of removal must contain evidentiary support, he argued the Court should dismiss the case as improvidently granted in light of the fact that the issue the Court granted certiorari to review was not properly before the Court. Because the Court was reviewing the Tenth Circuit's decision to deny review, Justice Scalia explained that "the only question before us is whether the Tenth Circuit abused its discretion in denying Dart permission to appeal the District Court’s remand order". Justice Scalia argued that the majority impermissibly concluded the Tenth Circuit denied review because it agreed with the District Court's legal analysis. Instead, Justice Scalia suggested the Tenth Circuit may have denied review for a legally permissible reason, and it would be inappropriate to assume that a court adopted a party's erroneous reasoning. In the final sentence of his opinion, Justice Scalia argued that because the Court failed to dismiss the case as improvidently granted, it should have affirmed the Tenth Circuit's decision to deny review "since we have absolutely no basis for concluding that it abused its discretion".

=== Justice Thomas' dissenting opinion ===
Justice Clarence Thomas wrote a separate dissenting opinion in which he argued that the Supreme Court lacks jurisdiction "to review even the Court of Appeals' denial of permission to appeal". Justice Thomas noted that federal statutory law permits the Supreme Court to review "[c]ases in the courts of appeals", but he argued an application for permission to appeal a remand order is not a "case" because "it does not assert a grievance against anyone, does not seek remedy or redress for any legal injury, and does not even require a 'party' on the other side". He concluded that no "osmosis could transform an application for permission to appeal a remand order into a case". Additionally, Justice Thomas also criticized the majority opinion for extending precedent that held certificates of appealability in federal habeas corpus cases should be considered "cases" for the purpose of appellate jurisdiction. Because the Tenth Circuit did not decide a "case", Justice Thomas concluded that the Court should dismiss the case for lack of jurisdiction.

== Commentary and analysis ==
Commentators have described the Court's ruling in Dart Cherokee as a victory for attorneys who defend against class actions. Patrick H. Sims described the case as a "stress reliever" and noted that it "contains language that is rhapsodic to a prospective removing defendant's lawyer, both specifically as to the issue of jurisdictional amount and as to removal notices in general". Mark Moller suggested that "[t]he Court's affirmance in Dart that CAFA's findings section overcomes any 'antiremoval presumption with respect to CAFA' may presage a significant narrowing of some [CAFA] loopholes". Jessica K. Pruitt also observed that the Court's ruling in Dart Cherokee "effectively expands" the Court's 2013 ruling in Standard Fire Insurance Co. v. Knowles, a case in which the Supreme Court held that plaintiffs in a class action could not avoid federal court jurisdiction by stipulating that damages would be less than the $5 million threshold set by CAFA. However, Ronald Mann wrote that the decision in Dart Cherokee may actually force the Court to spend "several years repairing the damage to the law of review, steadily limiting the broad review of discretion applied here".
