= Hertz Corp. v. Friend =

- Supreme Court of the United States

Argued November 10, 2009 Decided February 23, 2010
- Full case name: The Hertz Corporation v. Melinda Friend, et al.
- Docket no.: 08-1107
- Citations: 559 U.S. 77 (more) 130 S. Ct. 1181; 175 L. Ed. 2d 1029; 78 U.S.L.W. 4153; 10 Cal. Daily Op. Serv. 2181; 2010 Daily Journal D.A.R. 2667; 22 Fla. L. Weekly Fed. S 130; 2010 U.S. LEXIS 1897
- Argument: Oral argument
- Opinion announcement: Opinion announcement

Case history
- Prior: Motion to remand granted, 2008 WL 7071465 (N.D. Cal. 2008); upheld, 297 Fed. Appx. 690 (9th Cir. 2008); cert. granted, 556 U.S. 1281 (2009)
- Subsequent: On remand, 375 Fed. Appx. 757 (9th Cir. 2010)

Holding
- For purposes of diversity jurisdiction, a corporation's principal place of business is its "nerve center".

Court membership
- Chief Justice John Roberts Associate Justices John P. Stevens · Antonin Scalia; Anthony Kennedy · Clarence Thomas; Ruth Bader Ginsburg · Stephen Breyer; Samuel Alito · Sonia Sotomayor

Case opinion
- Majority: Breyer, joined by unanimous

Laws applied
- 28 U.S.C. § 1332

Hertz Corp. v. Friend, 559 U.S. 77 (2010), was a United States Supreme Court case which held that for the purposes of diversity jurisdiction, a corporation's principal place of business is its "nerve center": the state in which its high-level executives work and direct the corporation. Diversity jurisdiction, described in the Judiciary Act of 1789, allows federal courts to hear cases on state law if the parties are "citizens" of different states. Since 1958, a corporation's citizenship is determined based on its principal place of business and where it is incorporated.

In 2007, two employees of The Hertz Corporation who lived in California sued the company over unpaid overtime, a violation of California state law. Hertz sought to remove the case from California state court to federal court on the basis that the corporation was a "citizen" of New Jersey, where its headquarters was, and Delaware, where it is incorporated. Under Hertz's theory, diversity jurisdiction applied because neither of those significant locations was California. At the time of the case, the Ninth Circuit, which oversees federal courts in California, primarily determined a corporation's principal place of business based on the state in which it conducted the most business. Hertz, doing more of its business in California than any other state, argued in the Supreme Court that this test should be replaced with a "headquarters test" that designated a corporation's headquarters as its principal place of business.

The Supreme Court unanimously rejected both the Ninth Circuit's test and Hertz's proposal, opting to instead determine the principal place of business based on the corporation's "actual center of direction, control and coordination". This "nerve center" test had prior only been used by the Seventh Circuit, and the Supreme Court's decision resolved a circuit split. Justice Stephen Breyer, writing for the court, argued that the nerve center test best reflected the language of the Judiciary Act, was administratively simple, and best fulfilled Congress's intent in passing the Act. Hertz was considered a win for business defendants, who prefer litigating in federal courts, and a loss for plaintiffs across the country, who had a new obstacle in suing national corporations in California state court. The decision is considered a landmark opinion in American civil procedure and is taught in law schools as part of their elementary civil procedure curriculum.

== Background ==
"Principal place of business" tests used before Hertz, by state Nerve center Center of corporate activity Place of operations, primarily Total activity No test

The Judiciary Act of 1789 grants federal courts the ability to hear cases concerning state law (as opposed to federal law) under a limited set of circumstances, with the case otherwise heard in state court. One of these circumstances is "diversity jurisdiction", where the parties in the case are "citizens" of different states. The Class Action Fairness Act of 2005 (CAFA) modifies this rule slightly: in a class action lawsuit, at least one member of the class must be a citizen of a different state than any of the defendants. (Note: In a class action lawsuit, the "named plaintiffs" sue the defendant on behalf of a hypothetical category (the "class") of people whom the defendant similarly harmed.)

For natural persons (i.e., human beings), "citizenship" is determined based on where the parties are domiciled, which is in essence where they primarily live. (Note: "Citizenship" of a state is not to be confused with literal citizenship of the United States, which involves different criteria. In 1988 and again in 2011, Congress amended the Judiciary Act to clarify that one can be a noncitizen of the United States but a citizen of a state within the country for diversity jurisdiction purposes.) Corporations, not being natural persons, are treated differently: since 1958, the Judiciary Act has specified that they are citizens of the state they are incorporated in as well as the state where their "principal place of business" is located. The latter term was ill-defined, and throughout the years, jurisdictions developed their own methods of determining a corporation's principal place of business, each with their own justifications, resulting in a circuit split among the various federal courts of appeals:

- The Seventh Circuit used the nerve center test, which designated the state from which the corporation's officers direct its activities as its principal place of business.
- The Third Circuit used a "center of corporate activities" test that was similar to the nerve center test, but also considered the locations of employees and plants.
- The Ninth Circuit primarily used the place of operations test, which designated the state where the corporation chiefly conducts its business operations (e.g. where most of its employees work, where it conducts the most sales) as the principal place of business. However, it resorted to the nerve center test if a corporation's operations were evenly spread across multiple states.
- The Fifth, Sixth, Eighth, Tenth, and Eleventh Circuits used the total activity test, which blended the nerve center and place of operations tests.
- The First, Second, and Fourth Circuits did not formally adopt any test, though in effect their rulings followed a similar methodology to the total activity test.
- The D.C. District, a federal district court which encompasses the same territory as the D.C. Circuit, did not endorse a particular test and determined which test to use based on the circumstances of the case.

Due to the ambiguity of the tests used by courts, the legal community also varied in how to describe each circuit's practices; the above is simply one formulation.

== Case ==
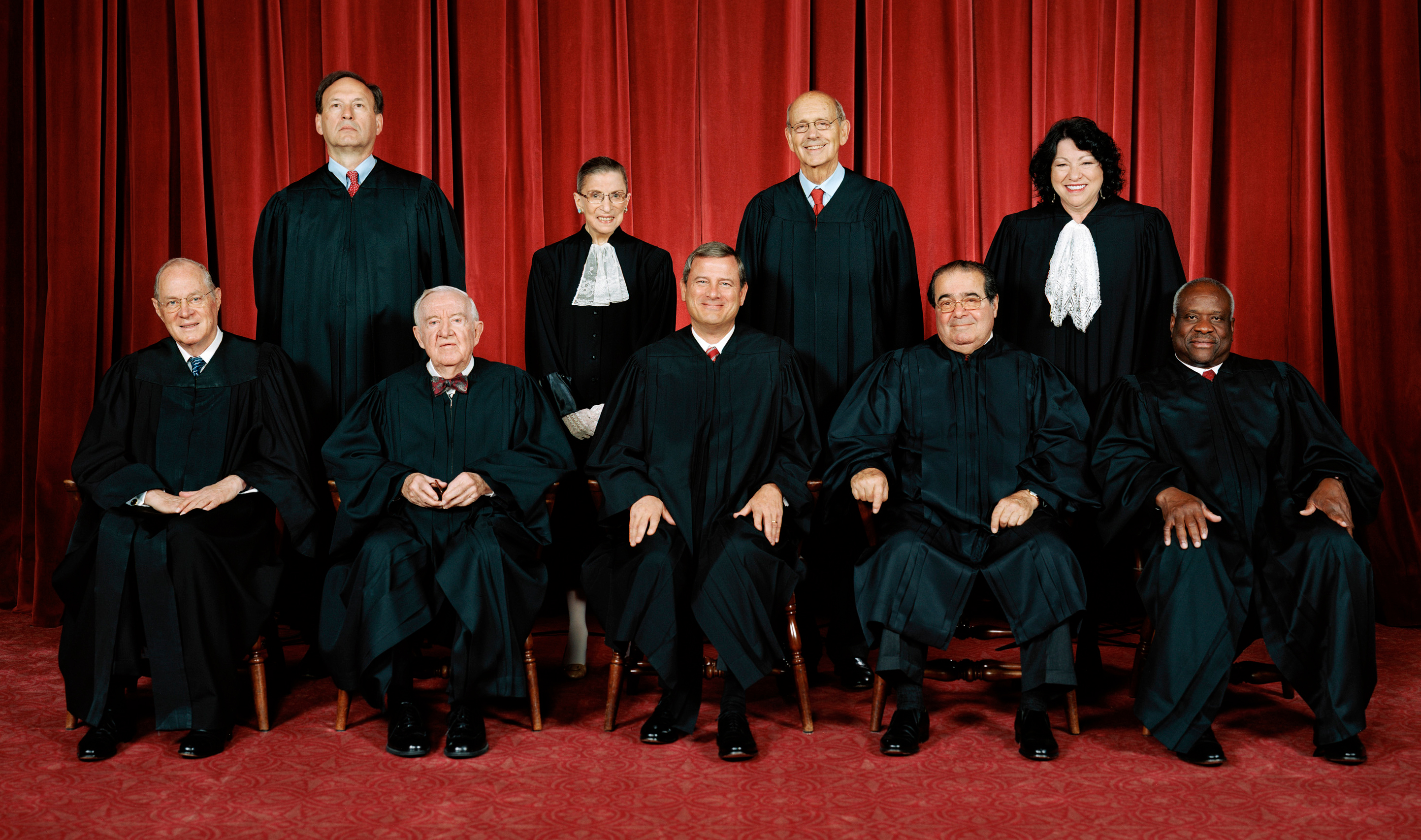
The Supreme Court justices in 2009

In September 2007, California citizens Melinda Friend and John Nhieu sued their employer, The Hertz Corporation, a car rental company headquartered in New Jersey, alleging that they had not been paid overtime wages in violation of California state law. The case developed into a class action with other similarly-situated citizens of California. Pursuant to CAFA, Hertz removed the case from California state court, where it had been filed, to the Northern District of California, a federal district court in the Ninth Circuit. However, the plaintiffs moved to remand the case back to state court, claiming that the case failed to meet CAFA's standard for diversity jurisdiction.

In January 2008, the district court granted the motion to remand. Applying the Ninth Circuit's place of operations test, it found that Hertz was a citizen of California because the large plurality of the company's business activities were performed in California. Since the plaintiffs (and by definition the class members) were also Californians, this meant that the district court did not have diversity jurisdiction and had no authority to hear the case. Hertz, claiming to be a citizen of New Jersey and Delaware (where it is incorporated), argued that the test should be adjusted for population since California has a much larger population than any other state, but the district court was unpersuaded. Hertz appealed the case to the Ninth Circuit, arguing that the district court had misapplied the test. The Ninth Circuit affirmed the lower court's decision. Hertz appealed again, and the Supreme Court granted certiorari.

In their briefings to the court, the plaintiffs defended the Ninth Circuit test as the fairest and closest to the intended meaning of the Judiciary Act, while Hertz changed its tactics and argued for a "headquarters test" that would simply designate a corporation's headquarters as its principal place of business, arguing that this was the simplest, matched best with the statutory language, and prevented forum shopping. The Legal Aid Society wrote an amicus brief supporting the plaintiffs, while the United States Chamber of Commerce, Business Roundtable, and American Trucking Associations provided a joint amicus brief supporting Hertz.

The court held oral arguments on the case on November 10, 2009. Sri Srinivasan, who would later become the chief judge of the D.C. Circuit, represented Hertz in oral arguments. The court and parties primarily discussed the practical implications of their offered tests and how they would affect large corporations like Wal-Mart and Starbucks. (Note: Wal-Mart is headquartered in Arkansas, while Starbucks is headquartered in Washington. According to the place of operations test, however, they would have likely been citizens of Texas and California, respectively, due to the large number of employees and facilities in those states.) The justices showed sympathy towards the simpler headquarters test with Anthony Kennedy praising its accessibility, though Sonia Sotomayor noted the possibility of the test being abused via a "shell headquarters". Conversely, the justices criticized the center of corporate activities test across the board. Antonin Scalia emphasized that the phrase "principal place of business" implied a headquarters-focused test rather than one focused on business activity. Ruth Bader Ginsburg and John Paul Stevens criticized the test as overly complex, which creates heavy costs for less wealthy litigants. Ginsburg, Scalia, and John Roberts noted that the place of operations test disproportionately favored large and heavily populated states, particularly California, which by their nature often contain most of a nationally-sized corporation's business.

In addition to the practicality of the test, the parties discussed Congress's intent in creating and later amending the Judiciary Act; the plaintiffs particularly emphasized that the place of operations test was more difficult for a corporation to manipulate to their benefit and that the phrase "principal place of business" had long been used by bankruptcy courts to refer to a place of operations, even before the term was used in the Judiciary Act. The plaintiffs had also argued in their brief that the district court's remand was not reviewable by an appellate court. However, during oral arguments, no justice asked a question about the claim and Roberts expressly stated that he was not personally interested in discussing it.

Before the decision, it was generally expected that the court would rule in favor of Hertz and adopt the headquarters test. Nonetheless, the case was closely watched for its potential to dictate the course of civil cases, particularly class actions and multidistrict litigation.

== Decision ==
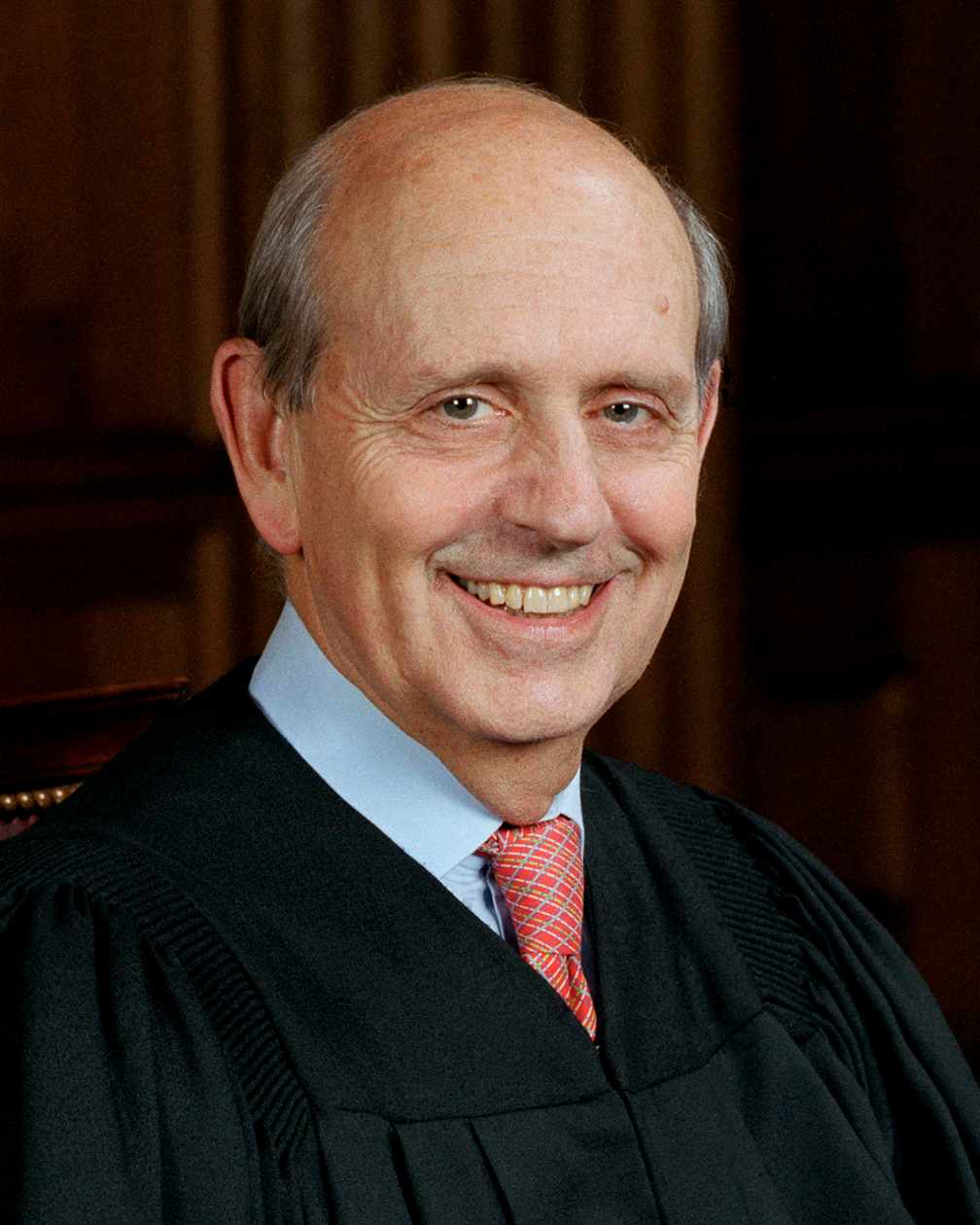
Stephen Breyer wrote the Supreme Court's unanimous opinion.

The Supreme Court unanimously ruled in favor of Hertz, but it endorsed the nerve center test rather than the headquarters test. Justice Stephen Breyer, writing for the court, gave three reasons for the decision: the language of the Judiciary Act, practical considerations, and the Act's legislative history.

Breyer first noted that the phrasing of the term "principal place of business" implied that the citizenship of a corporation depended on a single location rather than a spread-out area, favoring the nerve center test. His primary concern, however, was administrative simplicity. Criticizing more complex tests for "eating up time and money as the parties litigate" issues secondary to the actual merits of the case, the opinion endorsed the nerve center test for its straightforwardness and predictability, being based on a single location at a time.

Lastly, Breyer discussed the legislative history of the Judiciary Act and the purpose of diversity jurisdiction, which to the Court was "to find the State where a corporation is least likely to suffer out-of-state prejudice when it is sued in a local court". He concluded that the nerve center test was most likely to effectuate this goal, also suggesting that Congress in passing the Act did not intend to create a cumbersome or complicated rule. Breyer wrote that the test was not perfect, stating that in some cases officers may be in many different locations and that "anomalies" could result if a company's nerve center and business activities were in different states.

The opinion rejected Hertz's arguments for a headquarters test, noting that while in most circumstances a corporation's headquarters would be its nerve center, the nature of a nerve center was that it was the "actual center of direction, control and coordination" for the corporation; an empty building that executives occasionally gather in, for example, could be a headquarters, but it could not be a nerve center.

== Significance ==
Hertz is considered a landmark decision in American civil procedure. Sina Kian, a professor at Stanford Law School writing for SCOTUSblog, remarked that "the sparse media attention afforded to the decision should not obscure its significance", noting that prior to Hertz, only the Seventh Circuit had adopted the nerve center test and that many large corporations which had previously been considered citizens of California by dint of their business activities there were now citizens of different states. Hertz and the nerve center test are taught in foundational civil procedure classes in law schools.

The ruling in Hertz was seen as a win for business defendants and a loss for plaintiffs in general. Federal courts are perceived as generally more friendly to businesses than state courts, and the ruling makes it harder to sue national companies in California state court. Attorneys, particularly those representing employers, praised the ruling as clarifying an important part of civil procedure and providing a simple rule for corporations to follow. On the other hand, one lawyer for the plaintiffs remarked that the ruling would result in more federal cases, overburdening the courts and making lawsuits more expensive. Following Hertz, firms tended to increase their operations in states with less business-friendly courts. Conversely, the ruling "pinned" firms to the location of their nerve center, restricting their ability to remove lawsuits in their "headquarters state" to federal court due to the forum-defendant rule. Writing fifteen years after the initial decision, Zoe E. Niesel of Joseph F. Rice School of Law found that, although Hertz had largely simplified the determination of a corporation's principal place of business, a few "hard cases" remained where decision-makers were geographically spread out, requiring the court to determine where the bulk of decision-making power was. Hertz only applies to corporations. Other types of businesses, such as limited liability companies, require different tests to determine their citizenship, even though they may have "nerve centers".

Attorney John T. Mitchell wrote in GPSolo Magazine that Hertz, in recognizing that corporations had a "brain", represented a step in their gradual humanization, comparing it to Citizens United v. FEC, which had also been decided in 2010. He also criticized the decision for allowing inexact results, particularly in the age of teleconferencing, and being unclear as to when an executive performs "nerve center activity". Saru M. Matambanadzo of Tulane Law School also compared Hertz to other "corporate personhood" cases, noting their similar usage of body-based metaphors.

== See also ==
- 2009 term United States Supreme Court opinions of Stephen Breyer
