= Pendent party jurisdiction =

In the United States federal courts, pendent party jurisdiction refers to a court's power to adjudicate a claim against a party who would otherwise not be subject to the jurisdiction of the federal courts, because the claim arose from a common nucleus of operative fact.

One well-known example of this is when a federal court adjudicates a state law claim asserted against a third party which is part of a case brought to it under its federal question jurisdiction. This was the situation in Finley v. United States, 490 U.S. 545 (1989), in which the Supreme Court found that a grant of jurisdiction over a claim involving certain parties did not extend to additional claims involving different parties. Finley was superseded by Exxon Mobil Corp. v. Allapattah Services, 545 U.S. 546, in which the Supreme Court noted that Congress overturned the result in Finley by enacting 28 U.S.C. § 1367.

Pendent party jurisdiction is a form of supplemental jurisdiction covered by 28 U.S.C. § 1367. Subsection (b) prohibits parties from being joined in a federal case brought under the diversity jurisdiction of the federal courts (where diversity is the sole basis of federal court jurisdiction), if joining such parties would eliminate complete diversity.
