= Owen Equipment & Erection Co. v. Kroger =

- Supreme Court of the United States

Argued April 18, 1978 Decided June 21, 1978
- Full case name: Owen Equipment & Erection Company v. Kroger, Administratrix
- Citations: 437 U.S. 365 (more) 98 S. Ct. 2396; 57 L. Ed. 2d 274; 1978 U.S. LEXIS 114; 25 Fed. R. Serv. 2d (Callaghan) 554

Case history
- Prior: 558 F.2d 417 (8th Cir. 1977) (upholding verdict for plaintiff); cert. granted, 434 U.S. 1008 (1978).
- Subsequent: Codified in 28 U.S.C. § 1367(b)

Holding
- The court did not have ancillary jurisdiction to hear respondent's new claim that would defeat complete diversity because the new claim was not sufficiently related to the original claim and the plaintiff chose to bring the action in federal court.

Court membership
- Chief Justice Warren E. Burger Associate Justices William J. Brennan Jr. · Potter Stewart; Byron White · Thurgood Marshall; Harry Blackmun · Lewis F. Powell Jr. William Rehnquist · John P. Stevens

Case opinions
- Majority: Stewart, joined by Burger, Marshall, Blackmun, Powell, Rehnquist, Stevens
- Dissent: White, joined by Brennan

Laws applied
- 28 U.S.C. § 1332

Owen Equipment & Erection Co. v. Kroger, 437 U.S. 365 (1978), is a case that was decided by the United States Supreme Court regarding the civil procedure subject of ancillary jurisdiction.

== Facts ==
Respondent Kroger, a citizen of Iowa, filed suit against the Omaha Public Power District (OPPD), a Nebraska utility company. Her suit was to recover damages for the wrongful death of her husband, who was electrocuted while walking next to a crane whose boom came too close to a power line. OPPD, which owned the power line, filed a third-party complaint against Owen Equipment & Erection Co., which owned and operated the crane. Kroger then amended her complaint to name Owen as an additional defendant – describing it as a Nebraska Corporation with its principal place of business in Nebraska. Owen was a Nebraska corporation, but its principle place of business was in Iowa (specifically, in Carter Lake, Iowa). Notwithstanding that Owen was a Nebraska corporation, the Supreme Court ruled that Owen’s principal place of business (Iowa) established its corporate citizenship as Iowa – thus eliminating the diversity of citizenship required for jurisdiction under 28 U.S.C. § 1332.

== Procedure ==
When confronted with a motion to dismiss for lack of complete diversity, the United States District Court for the District of Nebraska reserved ruling until the end of the trial. Following a jury verdict in favor of the plaintiff, the federal district court in an unreported decision denied the motion to dismiss on diversity grounds. The Court of Appeals for the Eighth Circuit affirmed the lower court's decision, and the Supreme Court granted certiorari.

== Issue ==
Whether a court can hear a plaintiff's claim against a third-party defendant when there is no independent basis for federal jurisdiction over that claim in an action in which federal jurisdiction is based on diversity of citizenship, a circumstance called ancillary jurisdiction.

== Holding ==
Whereas the Eighth Circuit relied on United Mine Workers of America v. Gibbs, 383 U.S. 715 (1966), the Supreme Court in its 7 to 2 majority decision written by Justice Potter Stewart limited Gibbs to pendent jurisdiction, bringing state claims in addition to a federal claim. The Court set forth two limits on ancillary jurisdiction beyond the "common nucleus of operative fact" of Gibbs. First, the non-federal claim must be "ancillary and dependent" on the original claim rather than "new and independent", and second, courts can be more lenient to defendants than to plaintiffs because plaintiffs choose where the claims will be brought. In this instance, Kroger was a plaintiff who had chosen federal court and the claim against Owen was "entirely separate" from her original claim against OPPD "since [Owen's] liability to her depended not at all upon whether or not OPPD was also liable." Thus, the court generally upheld the complete diversity requirement of 28 U.S.C. § 1332(a)(1) but allowed certain limited exceptions for ancillary jurisdiction. Kroger, however, did not meet those exceptions.

== Dissent ==
Justice White dissented, stating that the majority overlooked such factors as convenience, judicial economy, and considerations of fairness in order to rigidly uphold legislation.

== Subsequent History ==
The majority's holding on ancillary jurisdiction was subsequently codified by Congress in 28 U.S.C. § 1367(b) as part of its supplemental jurisdiction statute.

== Carter Lake ==
The Court noted that geography had caused the issue. Owen was based in Carter Lake, Iowa, which is west of the Missouri River. Although the Missouri River generally is the boundary between Iowa and Nebraska, the river in 1877 had avulsed one of its bends, cutting off the land that later became the city of Carter Lake on the western side. The Supreme Court six years earlier had mentioned the circumstances of Carter Lake when it ruled on a boundary dispute between the two states in Nebraska v. Iowa, 406 U.S. 117 (1972).

== See also ==
- List of United States Supreme Court cases, volume 437
