= Commodity Futures Trading Commission v. Schor =

- Supreme Court of the United States

Argued April 29, 1986 Decided July 7, 1986
- Full case name: Commodity Futures Trading Commission v. Schor, et al.
- Citations: 478 U.S. 833 (more) 106 S. Ct. 3245; 92 L. Ed. 2d 675; 1986 U.S. LEXIS 144; 54 U.S.L.W. 5096; Comm. Fut. L. Rep. (CCH) ¶ 23,116

Case history
- Prior: Schor v. Commodity Futures Trading Comm'n, 740 F.2d 1262 (D.C. Cir. 1984), cert. granted, judgment vacated, 473 U.S. 922 (1985); on remand, 770 F.2d 211 (D.C. Cir. 1985); cert. granted, 474 U.S. 1018 (1985).

Holding
- Congress may grant pendent jurisdiction over state law counterclaims to administrative agencies.

Court membership
- Chief Justice Warren E. Burger Associate Justices William J. Brennan Jr. · Byron White; Thurgood Marshall · Harry Blackmun; Lewis F. Powell Jr. · William Rehnquist; John P. Stevens · Sandra Day O'Connor

Case opinions
- Majority: O'Connor, joined by Burger, White, Blackmun, Powell, Rehnquist, Stevens
- Dissent: Brennan, joined by Marshall

Laws applied
- U.S. Const. art. III; 7 U.S.C. § 1-27f

Commodity Futures Trading Commission v. Schor, 478 U.S. 833 (1986), was a case in which the Supreme Court of the United States held an administrative agency may, in some cases, exert jurisdiction over state-law counterclaims.

== Background ==
The Commodity Exchange Act (CEA), 7 U.S.C. § 1 et seq., prohibits fraudulent conduct in the trading of futures contracts. In 1974, Congress amended the Act to create a more comprehensive regulatory framework for the trading of future contracts. To that end, Congress created an administrative agency called the Commodity Futures Trading Commission (CFTC). One of the duties assigned to the CFTC was the administration of a quasi-judicial reparations procedure by which customers of commodities brokers could seek legal redress for brokers’ alleged violations of the Act or other CFTC regulations. One of the CFTC's regulations also provided the agency to adjudicate counterclaims “arising out of the same transaction or occurrence or series of transactions or occurrences set forth in the complaint”. The section of the statute and the CFTC regulation at issue in this case, both of which were intended to provide an inexpensive and expeditious method for the settlement of futures contract-related claims, were challenged by the customers of a broker as being violative of Article III of the United States Constitution.

== Facts & procedural history ==
In February 1980, respondents Schor and Mortgage Services of America, Inc. filed complaints with the CFTC against brokerage firm ContiCommodity Services, Inc. (Conti) and Richard L. Sandor, one of the firm's employees, alleging violations of the CEA. Meanwhile, Conti filed an action under diversity jurisdiction in the United States District Court for the Northern District of Illinois to recover the debit balance in Schor's account. Schor filed a counterclaim in the federal suit, asserting the same charges against Conti it had made in its complaint to the CFTC. Schor moved to dismiss the district court action, but the judge declined. Conti then voluntarily dismissed the suit, in order to present its counterclaim against Schor for the debit balance as a defense in the CFTC action.

The Administrative Law Judge (ALJ) in the CFTC reparations proceeding ruled in Conti's favor on both claims, and it was at that point Schor challenged the CFTC's jurisdiction to hear Conti's counterclaim against him. The ALJ rejected this contention, and the CFTC declined to review the decision. Schor then petitioned the United States Court of Appeals for the District of Columbia Circuit for review. The Court of Appeals held that the CFTC had jurisdiction over Schor's claim against Conti, but not over Conti's state-law based counterclaim against Schor for the debit balance, seeking to avoid the constitutional problems faced in Northern Pipeline Construction Co. v. Marathon Pipe Line Co. The U.S. Supreme Court granted certiorari, vacated the judgment, and remanded the case back to the Court of Appeals for further consideration under Thomas v. Union Carbide Agricultural Products Co. The Court of Appeals reinstated its previous judgment, and the Supreme Court granted certiorari again.

== Majority opinion ==
Justice O’Connor, joined by Chief Justice Burger and Justices White, Blackmun, Powell, Rehnquist and Stevens, authored the opinion of the Court, addressing the statutory interpretation issue first. She held that the D.C. Circuit created a false distinction between the CFTC's jurisdiction over state law counterclaims and counterclaims arising under the CEA, simply to avoid a constitutional problem, and ignored the legislative intent of Congress in doing so. The situation faced by the litigants here was common: a claim and counterclaim arising out of the same transaction and occurrence, and it was well within the statutory jurisdiction of the CFTC to adjudicate both such actions. This is in keeping with Congress’ intent to create a more efficient means of adjudicating such disputes, as well as the administration's interpretation of the statute.

She then turned to the Article III issue. Justice O’Connor chose to interpret Article III liberally, examining the underlying purposes of adjudication of cases by an independent judiciary. The right to be heard by an Article III tribunal is not absolute, and is subject to waiver by the parties. In this case, Schor waived his right to a trial with respect to Conti's counterclaim, and elected to have the entire dispute resolved before the CFTC. It was only after the CFTC ruled against him that he challenged the agency's jurisdiction. To Justice O’Connor, Schor's actions constituted an express waiver of his right to a civil trial.

Additionally, Justice O’Connor held that Congress’ grant of judicial power to the CFTC for the adjudication of state-law counterclaims did not intrude on the powers of the judiciary. She concluded that while Congress could not vest administrative agencies with ancillary or pendent jurisdiction of all claims, it was not outright forbidden for Congress to vest an agency with such jurisdiction over some claims. Unlike the situation in Northern Pipeline, not only were the CFTC's orders reviewable in the U.S. district courts, the CFTC was not granted the full powers of an Article III court, and the parties were given the option of invoking the agency's jurisdiction, rather than being compelled to use it. Furthermore, any issue of intrusion upon the powers of state courts was irrelevant, Justice O’Connor reasoned, because federal courts may exercise ancillary jurisdiction over state law claims anyway.

== Dissent ==
Justice Brennan, joined by Justice Marshall, dissented on the grounds that allowing Congress to grant such jurisdictional powers to administrative agencies eroded the powers of Article III courts, and deprived litigants of the impartial decision-making authority of an independent judiciary. He accused the majority of putting concerns of convenience and judicial economy ahead of separation of powers. Also, because the individual and structural/separation of powers issues served by Article III were “coextensive”, Brennan reasoned that the consent of the litigants to appear before a non-Article III tribunal should have no bearing on the legal analysis in this case.

== See also ==
- List of United States Supreme Court cases, volume 478
- List of United States Supreme Court cases
- Lists of United States Supreme Court cases by volume
- List of United States Supreme Court cases by the Rehnquist Court
