= Intervention (law) =

Court procedure to allow a nonparty to join ongoing litigation

In law, intervention is a procedure to allow a nonparty, called intervenor (also spelled intervener) to join ongoing litigation, either as a matter of right or at the discretion of the court, without the permission of the original litigants. The basic rationale for intervention is that a judgment in a particular case may affect the rights of nonparties, who ideally should have the right to be heard.

== Canada ==
Intervenors are most common in appellate proceedings but can also appear at other types of legal proceeding such as a trial.

In general, it is within the discretion of the court to allow or refuse an application to intervene. There are exceptions to that, however. For example, under subrule 61(4) of the Rules of the Supreme Court of Canada, if the court has stated a constitutional question, the attorney general of any province or territory or of the federal government, may intervene "as of right," without the need to be granted leave to intervene.

Courts will tend to allow an application to intervene if the applicant will provide a different perspective on the issues before the court, without expanding those issues.

Intervenors are permitted in criminal matters as well as civil matters. However, courts sometimes express concern in allowing applications for intervention in criminal matters if the applicant will make arguments against the position of the accused. It sometimes is seen as unfair for the accused in a criminal matter to be required to meet arguments from sources other than the prosecution.

There are several distinct reasons that someone might wish to intervene in a proceeding:

- if the proposed intervenor is currently a litigant in a case with legal issues similar or identical to the case at hand;
- if the proposed intervenor represents a group of people who have a direct concern in the legal issues raised in a case (for example, if the case involves deportation of a particular individual, an application for leave to intervene might be made by an interest group for the rights of refugee claimants);
- if the proposed intervenor is concerned that the court's decision in a particular case might be so broad as to affect the proposed intervenor's interests; in other words it would be an intervention to ensure that the court's ruling does not have unintended consequences.

It is often said that the role of intervenors is to "assist" the court in making a just decision on the dispute at hand. It is true that judges sometimes indicate that intervenors have aided the court in reaching a decision, the use of the word "assist" can be seen as misleading in that it implies the intervenor is acting altruistically. In general, the goal of the intervenor is to influence the court in making its decision, not just to "assist" the court.

Canadian and British courts use the term "amicus curiae" in a more limited sense. Generally, in Canada, an amicus curiae is someone who has been specifically commissioned by the court to provide a viewpoint which the court believes is necessary and otherwise lacking. In contrast, an intervenor is someone who has applied to the court to be heard on a matter. For example, the Quebec Secession Reference (a case in the Supreme Court of Canada) had one amicus curiae and several intervenors.

== Hong Kong SAR ==
Nonparties may intervene at the court's discretion if their presence is necessary to ensure that all matters in dispute can be effectually and completely determined, or if there is an issue arising from the relief claimed which would be just and convenient to determine with the nonparty. Relevant considerations in the exercise of this discretion include, for example, whether the intervener's legal or financial rights will be directly affected by the action, whether the intervener is in some way obliged to pay damages on a defendant's behalf, if the intervener's acts are connected to the action, and the presence of any common questions of law or fact.

== United Kingdom ==
The Attorney-General has the right to intervene in a private lawsuit if the lawsuit may affect "the prerogatives of the Crown, including its relations with foreign states". Furthermore, the Attorney-General may intervene with leave of the court where "the suit raises any question of public policy on which the executive may have a view which it may desire to bring to the notice of the court".

A court case may have several "interested parties". For example, in the case of Veolia ES Nottinghamshire Ltd v Nottinghamshire County Council (2009), a local taxpayer was named as the First Interested Party and the Audit Commission was named as the Second Interested Party.

In the context of judicial review, an interested party is 'any person (other than the claimant and defendant) who is directly affected by the claim'. For example, in Bell v Tavistock, the defendant (a specialist National Health Service clinic) offered GnRHa drug treatment to under-18 patients. The complainant, who sought this treatment as a teenager, in 2020 posited that due to her age she was unable to give informed consent. As the specialist clinic could not represent the wider NHS, the judiciary listed the NHS as an interested party, because of its role in supervision of the clinic and because it needed judicial notification of the results, for example in case other clinics were involved with the prescription of GnHRa drugs to under-16s. In the event, Matt Hancock decided not to instruct the Attorney-General but he had the opportunity to do so by virtue of being an interested party.

== United States ==
In the United States federal courts, intervention is governed by Rule 24 of the Federal Rules of Civil Procedure.

- Rule 24(a) governs intervention of right. A potential party (called the applicant) has the right to intervene in a case either (1) when a federal statute explicitly confers upon the applicant an unconditional right to intervene or (2) when the applicant claims an interest relating to the property or transaction which is the subject of the lawsuit. In the second situation, in order to be admitted as an intervenor, the applicant must show that its ability to protect its interest would be impeded by disposition of the case and that its interest is not adequately represented by the current parties to the case.
- Rule 24(b) provides for permissive intervention, which is subject to the discretion of the judge hearing the case. An applicant may be permitted by the court to intervene (1) when a federal statute confers upon the applicant a conditional right to intervene or (2) when the applicant's claim or defense shares a common question of law or fact with the main action. Agents of the federal or state government may be permitted by the court to intervene when a party to a case relies on a federal or state statute or executive order, or any regulation promulgated thereunder, for its claim or defense.

In both intervention of right and permissive intervention, the applicant must make a timely application to be heard. The applicant cannot sit on its rights; it must intervene as soon as it has reason to know that its interest may be adversely affected by the outcome of the pending litigation. The applicant must serve its motion to intervene on the parties to the case and explain its reasons for intervening in the motion papers. In addition, U.S. federal law does not allow the procedure of intervention to violate the requirements of diversity jurisdiction. The court must have either diversity jurisdiction or federal question jurisdiction over the intervenor's claim. Supplemental jurisdiction is not permitted for intervention claims under 28 U.S.C. § 1367(b) when the original claim's federal jurisdiction was based solely on diversity and exercising supplemental jurisdiction over the intervening claim would be inconsistent with the diversity requirements of 28 U.S.C. § 1332. However, supplemental jurisdiction is permitted when the claims are so related that they form the same case or controversy.

=== Texas ===
In the courts of the State of Texas, a jurisdiction whose rules of civil procedure differ considerably from the Federal Rules of Civil Procedure, a nonparty may intervene in a pending lawsuit by filing a pleading, which is typically called "plea in intervention" or "petition in intervention" without leave of the court, but any party in the pending lawsuit may object and ask for the intervention to be struck for cause. While the Texas Rules of Civil Procedure require no judicial permission and impose no intervention deadline, common law dictates that a party may not intervene post-judgment unless the trial court first sets aside the judgment. For the same reason, an intervenor must enter the lawsuit before final judgment to have standing to bring an appeal.

== See also ==
- Amicus curiae
- Contribution claim (legal)
