= American Well Works Co. v. Layne & Bowler Co. =

- Supreme Court of the United States

Argued May 5, 1916 Decided May 22, 1916
- Full case name: American Well Works Co. v. Layne & Bowler Co.
- Citations: 241 U.S. 257 (more) 36 S. Ct. 585; 60 L. Ed. 987; 1916 U.S. LEXIS 1751

Case history
- Prior: On writ of error from the United States District Court for the Eastern District of Arkansas

Holding
- Where one party wrongs another by making statements to the effect that an article sold by the latter infringes the former's patent, this is a question of state law and not federal patent law, and therefore §1331 grants no jurisdiction to federal district courts.

Court membership
- Chief Justice Edward D. White Associate Justices Joseph McKenna · Oliver W. Holmes Jr. William R. Day · Charles E. Hughes; Willis Van Devanter · Mahlon Pitney; James C. McReynolds

Case opinions
- Majority: Holmes, joined by White, Day, Hughes, Van Devanter, Pitney, McReynolds
- Dissent: McKenna

Laws applied
- 28 U.S.C. § 1331, 28 U.S.C. § 1338

American Well Works Co. v. Layne & Bowler Co., 241 U.S. 257 (1916), was a United States Supreme Court case governing the scope of federal question jurisdiction.

== Background ==
Plaintiff American Well Works Co. manufactured, sold, and held the patent to a particular type of pump, which was known to be the best on the market. The plaintiff sued defendant Layne & Bowler Co. on the grounds that defendant had maliciously libeled and slandered plaintiff's title to the pump by stating that the pump, and certain of its component parts, were infringements upon defendant's pump. Layne & Bowler had also filed lawsuits against others who used plaintiff's pump, and were threatening to sue all who used it.

American Well Works filed suit in the Arkansas state court, claiming actual damages of $50,000 as well as punitive damages. Layne & Bowler removed the suit to the United States District Court for the Eastern District of Arkansas on the grounds that the federal courts have exclusive jurisdiction over matters of patent law. The district court then dismissed the action. Plaintiff appealed directly to the United States Supreme Court.

== Issue ==
Did the district court properly dismiss the matter; i.e. was federal question jurisdiction present here?

== Decision ==
In a brief opinion, Justice Holmes wrote that this claim was based upon the allegedly defamatory actions and statements of the defendant, not any violation of the federal patent laws. The plaintiff alleged that defendant's conduct had damaged its business, and was not bringing suit to prove who had proper title to the patent. Holmes held that a suit for damages to a business caused by the defendant's allegations of patent infringement and threat to sue under the patent law was a matter of state law, and therefore the state courts had jurisdiction to hear the case. Whether or not defendant's statements about the patent were true was simply a piece of evidence to be examine by the state trial court.

Thus, under the rule stated by this case, whether a suit arises under state or federal law determines whether or not federal question jurisdiction exists. It is therefore consistent with the "well-pleaded complaint rule" set forth in Louisville & Nashville Railroad Company v. Mottley, 211 U.S. 149 (1908), just eight years earlier.

Justice McKenna dissented without opinion, on the grounds that he felt the case involved a direct and substantial controversy under the patent laws.
