= Exxon Mobil Corp. v. Allapattah Services, Inc. =

- Supreme Court of the United States

Argued March 1, 2005 Decided June 23, 2005
- Full case name: Exxon Mobil Corp. v. Allapattah Services, Inc.
- Citations: 545 U.S. 546 (more) 125 S. Ct. 2611; 162 L. Ed. 2d 502; 2005 U.S. LEXIS 5015

Case history
- Prior: Allapattah Servs., Inc. v. Exxon Corp., 157 F. Supp. 2d 1291 (S.D. Fla. 2001); affirmed, 333 F.3d 1248 (11th Cir. 2003); rehearing en banc denied, 362 F.3d 739 (11th Cir. 2004); Summary judgment granted, Del Rosario Ortega v. Star Kist Foods, Inc., 213 F. Supp. 2d 84 (D.P.R. 2002); affirmed in part, 370 F.3d 124 (1st Cir. 2004); Cert. granted, cases consolidated, 543 U.S. 924 (2004).

Holding
- 28 U.S.C. § 1367 permits supplemental jurisdiction over joined claims that do not individually meet the amount-in-controversy requirements of §1332, provided that at least one claim meets the amount-in-controversy requirements.

Court membership
- Chief Justice William Rehnquist Associate Justices John P. Stevens · Sandra Day O'Connor; Antonin Scalia · Anthony Kennedy; David Souter · Clarence Thomas; Ruth Bader Ginsburg · Stephen Breyer

Case opinions
- Majority: Kennedy, joined by Rehnquist, Scalia, Souter, Thomas
- Dissent: Stevens, joined by Breyer
- Dissent: Ginsburg, joined by Stevens, O'Connor, Breyer

Laws applied
- 28 U.S.C. § 1332, § 1367

Exxon Mobil Corp. v. Allapattah Services, Inc., 545 U.S. 546 (2005), was a case in which the Supreme Court of the United States held that 28 U.S.C. § 1367 permits supplemental jurisdiction over joined claims that do not individually meet the amount-in-controversy requirements of § 1332, provided that at least one claim meets the amount-in-controversy requirements.

== Background ==
Federal Courts are courts of limited subject matter jurisdiction. The limited jurisdiction is created by specific grants contained in Article III, Section 2 of the United States Constitution, and Congress is granted authority to further limit the jurisdiction of the federal court. Congress cannot grant jurisdiction to the federal courts that would be prohibited by the Constitution, but they have the authority to further limit (narrow the scope of jurisdiction). Historically, Congress has authorized exercise of two primary types of jurisdiction in civil cases: federal-question jurisdiction (28 U.S.C. § 1331), which grants jurisdiction over civil cases wherein the plaintiff seeks adjudication on the grounds of some Federal statute or rule; and diversity jurisdiction (28 U.S.C. § 1332), wherein the plaintiffs are from different states of the Union.

In order to limit the number of cases in federal court, both of these forms of jurisdiction once required that the amount of money, or equivalent monetary value in the case of non-monetary relief, must reach a certain threshold. These requirements were called amount-in-controversy requirements, and at the time of Exxon, only diversity jurisdiction cases retained such requirements.

Simple grants of jurisdiction over plaintiffs' original claims under § 1331 and § 1332 would present problems for the efficient adjudication of disputes; a federal court may not have subject-matter jurisdiction over potential counter-claims by defendants, or other claims such as impleader and cross-claims. Without jurisdiction for these claims, proceedings between parties could be unnecessarily and inefficiently split between federal and state courts. Two types of additional jurisdiction developed to address this issue via judicial interpretation: pendent and ancillary jurisdiction. Disagreeing with the decision reached by the Supreme Court in Finley v. United States regarding pendent-party jurisdiction, Congress enacted 28 U.S.C. § 1367, which brought pendent and ancillary jurisdiction under a single form of jurisdiction called supplemental jurisdiction.

The Exxon case was a combination of several United States Courts of Appeals cases, wherein certiorari was granted to resolve a split among Courts of Appeals. The question was whether § 1367 granted supplemental jurisdiction to claims and parties joined to a claim for which original jurisdiction was based solely upon diversity of citizenship, and where the additional joined claims did not independently meet the amount-in-controversy requirements of § 1332.

== Opinion of the Court ==
The United States Supreme Court, Justice Kennedy, held that supplemental jurisdiction statute permits exercise of diversity jurisdiction over additional plaintiffs who fail to satisfy minimum amount-in-controversy requirement, as long as other elements of diversity jurisdiction are present and at least one named plaintiff satisfies amount-in-controversy requirement.

Section 1367(a) is a broad grant of supplemental jurisdiction over other claims within the same case or controversy, as long as the action is one in which the district courts would have original jurisdiction. The last sentence of § 1367(a) makes it clear that the grant of supplemental jurisdiction extends to claims involving joinder or intervention of additional parties. The single question before us, therefore, is whether a diversity case in which the claims of some plaintiffs satisfy the amount-in-controversy requirement, but the claims of other plaintiffs do not, presents a “civil action of which the district courts have original jurisdiction.” If the answer is yes, § 1367(a) confers supplemental jurisdiction over all claims, including those that do not independently satisfy the amount-in-controversy requirement, if the claims are part of the same Article III case or controversy. If the answer is no, § 1367(a) is inapplicable and, in light of our holdings in Clark and Zahn, the district court has no statutory basis for exercising supplemental jurisdiction over the additional claims.

We now conclude the answer must be yes. When the well-pleaded complaint contains at least one claim that satisfies the amount-in-controversy requirement, and there are no other relevant jurisdictional defects, the district court, beyond all question, has original jurisdiction over that claim. The presence of other claims in the complaint, over which the district court may lack original jurisdiction, is of no moment. If the court has original jurisdiction over a single claim in the complaint, it has original jurisdiction over a “civil action” within the meaning of § 1367(a), even if the civil action over which it has jurisdiction comprises fewer claims than were included in the complaint. Once the court determines it has original jurisdiction over the civil action, it can turn to the question whether it has a constitutional and statutory basis for exercising supplemental jurisdiction over the other claims in the action.

== Dissenting opinions ==
Justice Stevens argued that the expansion of supplemental jurisdiction was prompted by a single case, designed to clarify district court jurisdiction over federal questions. Carefully examining the legislative history of the relevant portion of the statute, the dissenters concluded that a more narrow reading was preferable to the analysis of the majority. After a detailed analysis of ancillary and pendant jurisdiction, the historical precursors to supplemental jurisdiction.

Justice Ginsburg concluded that the ambiguities of the statute as enacted should be read to preserve continuity and precedent, in so far as that construction is possible. In applying that standard, she concluded that Congress did not intend, nor did the language they adopted enact, an expansive grant of additional jurisdiction such that joined parties should no longer have to independently meet ALL requirements of diversity jurisdiction, including the individual consideration of the amount-in-controversy requirement.
