= Finley v. United States =

- Supreme Court of the United States

Argued February 28, 1989 Decided May 22, 1989
- Full case name: Barbara Finley v. United States
- Citations: 490 U.S. 545 (more) 109 S. Ct. 2003
- Argument: Oral argument

Court membership
- Chief Justice William Rehnquist Associate Justices William J. Brennan Jr. · Byron White; Thurgood Marshall · Harry Blackmun; John P. Stevens · Sandra Day O'Connor; Antonin Scalia · Anthony Kennedy

Case opinions
- Majority: Scalia, joined by Rehnquist, White, O'Connor, Kennedy
- Dissent: Blackmun
- Dissent: Stevens, joined by Brennan, Marshall

Laws applied
- Federal Tort Claims Act
- Superseded by
- 28 U.S.C. § 1367

Finley v. United States, 490 U.S. 545 (1989), was a decision of the Supreme Court of the United States addressing the jurisdictional requirements of the Federal Tort Claims Act (FTCA). In response to the Finley decision, the United States Congress enacted a new statute on supplemental jurisdiction, 28 U.S.C. § 1367.

== Background ==
In 1983, Barbara Finley's husband and two of their children were flying into San Diego, California. As the plane approached San Diego, it flew into electric transmissions, causing the plane to crash. None of the passengers survived.

Finley sued in state court, alleging that San Diego Gas and Electric Company had been negligent in illuminating the transmission lines, and that the city of San Diego had been negligent in maintaining the runway lights. Finley subsequently learned that the Federal Aviation Administration was responsible for the runway lights, so she brought a new lawsuit in the United States District Court for the Southern District of California. Finley's complaint asserted that the federal district court had jurisdiction under the Federal Tort Claims Act. Later, Finley amended her federal complaint to re-assert her claims against the state-court defendants. There was no independent basis for jurisdiction over those parties.

The District Court granted Finley's motion based on a supplemental jurisdiction theory like that of United Mine Workers of America v. Gibbs. The Supreme Court granted certiorari to determine whether the FTCA permits supplemental party jurisdiction.

== Decision ==
Justice Scalia, quoting Chief Justice Marshall, stated that "two things are necessary to create jurisdiction, whether original or appellate. The Constitution must have given to the court the capacity to take it, and an act of Congress must have supplied it." In his majority opinion, Scalia argued that the Supreme Court must consistently adhere to a textualist interpretation of statutes to provide Congress with an understanding of how its laws will be enforced. The majority distinguished United Mine Workers, asserting that it viewed Congress' delegation of jurisdiction more narrowly.

Justices Stevens and Blackmun both dissented, arguing that pendent-party jurisdiction allows federal courts to fashion more complete relief in a more efficient manner.

== Aftermath ==
In 1990, Congress passed 28 U.S.C. § 1367 (part of the Civil Justice Reform Act) in response to Finley.
