= United Mine Workers of America v. Gibbs =

- Supreme Court of the United States

Argued January 20, 1966 Decided March 28, 1966
- Full case name: United Mine Workers of America v. Gibbs
- Citations: 383 U.S. 715 (more) 86 S.Ct. 1130, 16 L. Ed. 2d 218; 1966 U.S. LEXIS 2837

Case history
- Prior: Gibbs v. United Mine Workers of Am., 220 F. Supp. 871 (E.D. Tenn. 1963); affirmed, 343 F.2d 609 (6th Cir. 1965); cert. granted, 382 U.S. 809 (1965).

Holding
- In order for a United States district court to have pendent jurisdiction over a state-law cause of action, state and federal claims must arise from the same "common nucleus of operative fact" and the plaintiff must expect to try them all at once.

Court membership
- Chief Justice Earl Warren Associate Justices Hugo Black · William O. Douglas; Tom C. Clark · John M. Harlan II; William J. Brennan Jr. · Potter Stewart; Byron White · Abe Fortas

Case opinions
- Majority: Brennan, joined by Black, Douglas, Stewart, White, Fortas
- Concurrence: Harlan, joined by Clark
- Warren took no part in the consideration or decision of the case.

Laws applied
- U.S. Const., Art. III § 2; Labor-Management Relations Act

United Mine Workers of America v. Gibbs, 383 U.S. 715 (1966), was a case in which the Supreme Court of the United States held that in order for a United States district court to have pendent jurisdiction over a state-law cause of action, state and federal claims must arise from the same "common nucleus of operative fact" and the plaintiff must expect to try them all at once. This case was decided before the existence of the current supplemental jurisdiction statute, 28 U.S.C. § 1367.

== Facts and procedural history ==
This case arose out of a dispute between two labor unions over the representation of coal miners in Marion County, Tennessee. Plaintiff Paul Gibbs was a truck driver and coal miner who had been hired by the Grundy Company, a wholly owned subsidiary of the Tennessee Consolidated Coal Company, to be the superintendent of a coal mine to be opened near Gray's Creek, and to arrange for the coal to be hauled to the nearest railroad depot. The mine would have been within the jurisdiction of United Mine Workers of America (UMW) Local 5881, whose members had previously worked for Tennessee Consolidated. Gibbs had planned instead to use members of the rival Southern Labor Union to work the mine.

News of the mine's planned opening reached the UMW members, and on August 15 and 16, 1960, a group of armed miners from Local 5881 arrived at the site to prevent the mine from being opened. They threatened Gibbs, and beat the Southern Labor Union representative. UMW field representative George Gilbert was away on business in Middlesboro, Kentucky at the time of the incident, and learned of the violence while he was away. Gilbert returned to the site, and established a picket line, which lasted for nine months. There was no further violence at the site, and no further attempts were made by any party to open the mine.

Gibbs lost his job as mine superintendent, and was therefore unable to commence performance of his haulage contract. He also lost some of his other mine leases and trucking contracts elsewhere in the state. Believing that his losses were part of a union conspiracy against him, he sued the United Mine Workers (but not the specific local or its members) in the United States District Court for the Eastern District of Tennessee. The counts on Gibbs' complaint included allegations that the UMW engaged in a secondary boycott in violation of § 303 of the Labor-Management Relations Act, and that the UMW engaged in tortious interference with his employment relationship and a civil conspiracy in violation of the common law of the state of Tennessee.

The district court judge refused to submit to the jury the claims of pressure intended to cause mining firms other than Grundy to cease doing business with Gibbs, finding these claims unsupported by the evidence. The jury's verdict was that the UMW had violated both § 303 and state law. Gibbs was awarded $60,000 as damages under the employment contract and $14,500 under the haulage contract; he was also awarded $100,000 punitive damages. On motion, the trial court set aside the award of damages with respect to the haulage contract on the ground that the damages were unproved. It also held that union pressure on Grundy to discharge Gibbs as supervisor would constitute only a primary dispute with Grundy, as Gibbs' employer, and hence was not cognizable as a claim under 303. Interference with the employment relationship was cognizable as a state law claim, however, and a remitted award was sustained on that claim. The United States Court of Appeals for the Sixth Circuit affirmed the district court's decision.

== Decision ==
=== Majority opinion ===
Justice Brennan first held that Gibbs' state law claims were not preempted by federal law, and then moved on to the central issue in the case: whether the district court acted properly in exercising jurisdiction over both the state law and federal law claims. He wrote that the Federal Rules of Civil Procedure encouraged the joinder of claims, parties, and remedies to the broadest extent possible, in keeping with the principles of judicial economy and fairness to the parties. However, he noted that pendent jurisdiction, while it can exist whenever there is a federal question under Article III, § 2 of the Constitution, is a matter of discretion for the district court, not a matter of right for the plaintiff. Here, Brennan established the test for pendent jurisdiction known as the "common nucleus of operative fact": the claims must derive from the same situation, such that a plaintiff would ordinarily expect to try them all in one judicial proceeding.

Brennan listed some situations where pendent jurisdiction would be inappropriate. If the plaintiff's federal law claims are dismissed before trial, the state law claims should be as well; likewise, if the state law claims predominate in the plaintiff's complaint, the district court may dismiss the state law claims without prejudice for a state court to hear. Also, Brennan explained that in some cases, the likelihood of jury confusion in dealing with separate legal theories of relief could militate in favor of separate trials for the state and federal claims. Brennan concluded that even though the jury ruled against plaintiff on his federal claim, the preemption issue created a particularly good reason for exercising pendent jurisdiction in this case.

Brennan also held that the district court improperly instructed the jury on the conspiracy count, because the damages plaintiff was claiming must be proximately caused by violence or threats thereof, and that plaintiff had not shown "clear proof" that the UMW's management had endorsed violence as a means of settling the dispute (as required under the Norris–LaGuardia Act).

=== Concurring opinion ===
Justice Harlan wrote a brief concurrence, in which he agreed with Brennan's discussion of pendent jurisdiction, but disagreed with his interpretation of the standard of proof required for a claim under the Norris–LaGuardia Act.
