= List of United States Supreme Court cases, volume 7 =

Supreme Court of the United States
- Interactive map of Supreme Court of the United States
- 38°53′26″N 77°00′16″W
- Established: March 4, 1789; 237 years ago
- Location: Washington, D.C.
- Coordinates: 38°53′26″N 77°00′16″W
- Composition method: Presidential nomination with Senate confirmation
- Authorised by: Constitution of the United States, Art. III, § 1
- Judge term length: life tenure, subject to impeachment and removal
- Number of positions: 9 (by statute)
- Website: supremecourt.gov

This is a list of cases reported in volume 7 (3 Cranch) of United States Reports, decided by the Supreme Court of the United States in 1805 and 1806.

== Nominative reports ==
In 1874, the U.S. government created the United States Reports, and retroactively numbered older privately published case reports as part of the new series. As a result, cases appearing in volumes 1–90 of U.S. Reports have dual citation forms; one for the volume number of U.S. Reports, and one for the volume number of the reports named for the relevant reporter of decisions (these are called "nominative reports").

=== William Cranch ===
Starting with the 5th volume of U.S. Reports, the Reporter of Decisions of the Supreme Court of the United States was William Cranch. Cranch was Reporter of Decisions from 1801 to 1815, covering volumes 5 through 13 of United States Reports which correspond to volumes 1 through 9 of his Cranch's Reports. As such, the complete citation to, for example, Peyton v. Brooke is 7 U.S. (3 Cranch) 92 (1805).

== Justices of the Supreme Court at the time of 7 U.S. (3 Cranch) ==
The Supreme Court is established by Article III, Section 1 of the Constitution of the United States, which says: "The judicial Power of the United States, shall be vested in one supreme Court . . .". The size of the Court is not specified; the Constitution leaves it to Congress to set the number of justices. Under the Judiciary Act of 1789 Congress originally fixed the number of justices at six (one chief justice and five associate justices). Since 1789 Congress has varied the size of the Court from six to seven, nine, ten, and back to nine justices (always including one chief justice).

When the cases in 7 U.S. (3 Cranch) were decided, the Court comprised these six justices:

Portrait	Justice	Office	Home State	Succeeded	Date confirmed by the Senate (Vote)	Tenure on Supreme Court
	John Marshall	Chief Justice	Virginia	Oliver Ellsworth	January 27, 1801 (Acclamation)	February 4, 1801 – July 6, 1835 (Died)
	William Cushing	Associate Justice	Massachusetts	original seat established	September 26, 1789 (Acclamation)	February 2, 1790 – September 13, 1810 (Died)
	William Paterson	Associate Justice	New Jersey	Thomas Johnson	March 4, 1793 (Acclamation)	March 11, 1793 – September 8, 1806 (Died)
	Samuel Chase	Associate Justice	Maryland	John Blair, Jr.	January 27, 1796 (Acclamation)	February 4, 1796 – June 19, 1811 (Died)
	Bushrod Washington	Associate Justice	Virginia	James Wilson	December 20, 1798 (Acclamation)	November 9, 1798 (Recess Appointment) – November 26, 1829 (Died)
	William Johnson	Associate Justice	South Carolina	Alfred Moore	March 24, 1804 (Acclamation)	May 7, 1804 – August 4, 1834 (Died)

== Notable cases in 7 U.S. (3 Cranch) ==
=== United States v. More ===
In United States v. More, 7 U.S. (3 Cranch) 159 (1805), the Court held it had no jurisdiction to hear appeals from criminal cases in the circuit courts by writs of error. Relying on the Exceptions Clause, the Supreme Court held that Congress's enumerated grants of appellate jurisdiction to the Court operated as an exercise of Congress's power to eliminate all other forms of appellate jurisdiction. More ensured that the Court's criminal jurisprudence would be limited to writs of error from the state (and later, territorial) courts, habeas petitions, and writs of error from habeas petitions in the circuit courts, and certificates of division and mandamus from the circuit courts. Congress did not grant the Court jurisdiction to hear writs of error from the circuit courts in criminal cases until 1889, for capital crimes, and 1891, for other "infamous" crimes. The Judicial Code of 1911 abolished the circuit courts, transferred the trial of crimes to the district courts, and extended the Supreme Court's appellate jurisdiction to all crimes. But, these statutory grants were construed not to permit writs of error filed by the prosecution, as in More.

=== Strawbridge v. Curtiss ===
In Strawbridge v. Curtiss, 7 U.S. (3 Cranch) 267 (1806) the Supreme Court first addressed the question of complete diversity for diversity jurisdiction. In a brief opinion the Court held that for federal diversity jurisdiction, under section 11 of the Judiciary Act of 1789, no party on one side of a suit may be a citizen of the same state as any party on the other side. Therefore, when there are joint plaintiffs or defendants, jurisdiction must be established as to each individual party. That requirement remains acceptable in law as a matter of statutory interpretation, not constitutional command.

== Citation style ==
Under the Judiciary Act of 1789 the federal court structure at the time comprised District Courts, which had general trial jurisdiction; Circuit Courts, which had mixed trial and appellate (from the US District Courts) jurisdiction; and the United States Supreme Court, which had appellate jurisdiction over the federal District and Circuit courts—and for certain issues over state courts. The Supreme Court also had limited original jurisdiction (i.e., in which cases could be filed directly with the Supreme Court without first having been heard by a lower federal or state court). There were one or more federal District Courts and/or Circuit Courts in each state, territory, or other geographical region.

Bluebook citation style is used for case names, citations, and jurisdictions.

- "C.C.D." = United States Circuit Court for the District of . . .
  - e.g.,"C.C.D.N.J." = United States Circuit Court for the District of New Jersey
- "D." = United States District Court for the District of . . .
  - e.g.,"D. Mass." = United States District Court for the District of Massachusetts
- "E." = Eastern; "M." = Middle; "N." = Northern; "S." = Southern; "W." = Western
  - e.g.,"C.C.S.D.N.Y." = United States Circuit Court for the Southern District of New York
  - e.g.,"M.D. Ala." = United States District Court for the Middle District of Alabama
- "Ct. Cl." = United States Court of Claims
- The abbreviation of a state's name alone indicates the highest appellate court in that state's judiciary at the time.
  - e.g.,"Pa." = Supreme Court of Pennsylvania
  - e.g.,"Me." = Supreme Judicial Court of Maine

== List of cases in 7 U.S. (3 Cranch) ==
Case Name	Page & year	Opinion of the Court	Concurring opinion(s)	Dissenting opinion(s)	Lower court	Disposition
Huidekoper's Lessee v. Douglass	1 (1805)	Marshall	Johnson	none	C.C.D. Pa.	certification
United States v. Hooe	73 (1805)	Marshall	none	none	C.C.D.C.	multiple
Peyton v. Brooke	92 (1805)	Marshall	none	none	C.C.D.C.	affirmed
Lambert's Lessee v. Paine	97 (1805)	Johnson	Washington, Paterson, Cushing	none	C.C.D. Va.	affirmed
Hodgson v. Butts	140 (1805)	Marshall	none	none	C.C.D.C.	affirmed
United States v. More	159 (1805)	Marshall	none	none	C.C.D.C.	dismissed
Faw v. Roberdeau's Executor	174 (1805)	Marshall	none	none	C.C.D.C.	reversed
Ray v. Law	179 (1805)	Marshall	none	none	C.C.D.C.	appeal allowed
Levy v. Gadsby	180 (1805)	Marshall	none	none	C.C.D.C.	affirmed
Marine Insurance Company v. Wilson	187 (1805)	Washington	Paterson	none	C.C.D.C.	affirmed
Wilson v. Codman's Executor	193 (1805)	Marshall	none	none	C.C.D.C.	affirmed
Hallet v. Jenks	210 (1805)	Marshall	none	none	N.Y.	affirmed
Milligan v. Milledge	220 (1805)	Marshall	none	none	C.C.D. Georgia	reversed
Cooke v. Graham's Administrator	229 (1805)	Marshall	none	none	C.C.D.C.	reversed
Dobynes v. United States	241 (1806)	per curiam	none	none	D. Ky.	reversed
Hannay v. Eve	242 (1806)	Marshall	none	none	C.C.D. Ga.	affirmed
Silsby v. Young	249 (1806)	Marshall	none	none	C.C.D. Ga.	reversed
Montalet v. Murray	249 (1806)	Marshall	none	none	not indicated	dismissed
Strawbridge v. Curtiss	267 (1806)	Marshall	none	none	C.C.D. Mass.	affirmed
Gordon v. Caldcleugh	268 (1806)	Marshall	none	none	S.C. Ct. Eq.	dismissed
McFerran v. Taylor	270 (1806)	Marshall	none	none	D. Ky.	reversed
Wilson v. Speed	283 (1806)	Marshall	none	none	D. Ky.	reversed
Buddicum v. Kirk	293 (1806)	Marshall	none	none	C.C.D.C.	affirmed
Douglass v. McAllister	298 (1806)	Marshall	none	none	C.C.D.C.	affirmed
Simms v. Slacum	300 (1806)	Marshall	none	Paterson	C.C.D.C.	reversed
Harris v. Johnston	311 (1806)	Marshall	none	none	C.C.D.C.	reversed
Dixon's Executors v. Ramsay's Executors	319 (1806)	Marshall	none	none	C.C.D.C.	affirmed
Scott v. London	324 (1806)	Marshall	none	none	C.C.D.C.	reversed
Wise v. Withers	331 (1806)	Marshall	none	none	C.C.D.C.	reversed
United States v. Grundy	337 (1806)	Marshall	none	none	C.C.D. Baltimore	affirmed
Marine Insurance Company v. Tucker	357 (1806)	Johnson	Washington, Cushing, Paterson	none	C.C.D.C.	affirmed
United States v. Heth	399 (1806)	Johnson	Washington, Paterson, Cushing	none	C.C.D. Va.	certification
Manella, Pujals and Company v. Barry	415 (1806)	Marshall	none	none	C.C.D. Md.	affirmed
Ex parte Burford	448 (1806)	Marshall	none	none	C.C.D.C.	prisoner discharged
Hopkirk v. Bell	454 (1806)	per curiam	none	none	C.C.D. Va.	certification
Maley v. Shattuck	458 (1806)	Marshall	none	none	C.C.D. Pa.	reversed
Lawrason v. Mason	492 (1806)	Marshall	none	none	C.C.D.C.	affirmed
Knox v. Summers	496 (1806)	Washington	none	none	C.C.D.C.	reversed
Sands v. Knox	499 (1806)	Marshall	none	none	N.Y.	affirmed
Randolph v. Ware	503 (1806)	Paterson	Cushing	none	C.C.D. Va.	affirmed
Winchester v. Jackson	514 (1806)	per curiam	none	none	not indicated	dismissed
Field v. Milton	514 (1806)	per curiam	none	none	not indicated	certiorari granted

== See also ==
- certificate of division
