= Amount in controversy =

Term used in civil procedures in the US

Amount in controversy (sometimes called jurisdictional amount) is a term used in civil procedure to denote the amount at stake in a lawsuit, in particular in connection with a requirement that persons seeking to bring a lawsuit in a particular court must be suing for a certain minimum amount (or below a certain maximum amount) before that court may hear the case.

== United States ==
=== In federal courts ===
==== Diversity jurisdiction ====
In United States federal courts, the term currently applies only to cases brought under diversity jurisdiction, meaning that the court is able to hear the case only because it is between citizens of different states. In such cases, the U.S. Congress has decreed in 28 U.S.C. § 1332(a) that the court may hear such suits only where "the matter in controversy exceeds the sum or value of $75,000." This amount represents a significant increase from earlier years.

Congress first established the amount in controversy requirement when it created diversity jurisdiction in the Judiciary Act of 1789, pursuant to its powers under Article III of the U.S. Constitution, the amount being $500. It was raised to $2,000 in 1887, to $3,000 in 1911, to $10,000 in 1958, to $50,000 in 1988, and finally to the current $75,000 in 1996.

The use of the word "exceeds" in Section 1332 implies that the amount in controversy must be more than $75,000; a case removed from state court to federal court must be remanded back to state court if the amount in controversy is exactly $75,000.00.

==== Federal question jurisdiction ====
Congress did not create a consistent federal question jurisdiction, which allows federal courts to hear any case alleging a violation of the Constitution, laws, and treaties of the United States, until 1875, when Congress created the statute which is now found at 28 U.S.C. § 1331: "The district courts shall have original jurisdiction of all civil actions arising under the Constitution, laws, or treaties of the United States." At that time, such cases had the same amount in controversy requirement as the diversity cases. Congress eliminated this requirement in actions against the United States in 1976 and in all federal question cases in 1980.

==== Aggregation of claims ====
Where a single plaintiff has multiple unrelated claims against a single defendant, that plaintiff can aggregate those claims – that is, add the amounts together – to satisfy the amount in controversy requirement. In cases involving more than one defendant, a plaintiff may aggregate the amount claimed against multiple defendants “only if the defendants are jointly liable.” Middle Tennessee News Co., Inc. v. Charnel of Cincinnati, Inc., 250 F.3d 1077, 1081 (7th Cir. 2001). However, “if the defendants are severally liable, plaintiff must satisfy the amount in controversy requirement against each individual defendant.” The 5–4 decision in Exxon Mobil Corp. v. Allapattah Services, Inc., 545 U.S. 546 (2005), held that a federal court has supplemental jurisdiction over claims of other plaintiffs who do not meet the jurisdictional amount for a diversity action, when at least one plaintiff in the action does satisfy the jurisdictional amount.

==== Legal certainty test ====
The standard for dismissing a complaint for lack of meeting the amount in controversy is a rather high one in federal court. In 1938, Justice Owen Roberts set forth the "legal-certainty test", which is still used today:

It must appear to a legal certainty that the claim is really for less than the jurisdictional amount to justify dismissal. The inability of plaintiff to recover an amount adequate to give the court jurisdiction does not show his bad faith or oust the jurisdiction. Nor does the fact that the complaint discloses the existence of a valid defense to the claim. But if, from the face of the pleadings, it is apparent to a legal certainty that the plaintiff cannot recover the amount claimed or if, from the proofs, the court is satisfied to a like certainty that the plaintiff never was entitled to recover that amount, and that his claim was therefore colorable for the purpose of conferring jurisdiction, the suit will be dismissed.

The validity of the amount of damages claimed is considered a threshold issue of law for a judge to decide at the commencement of the case.

The legal certainty test is often heavily litigated in personal injury or wrongful death cases, in the situation where they are removed by a defendant to federal court on the basis of diversity jurisdiction, and then the plaintiff moves to remand to state court. Several U.S. states prohibit plaintiffs in such cases from demanding a specific amount of money in the ad damnum section of their complaints, because of serious problems with unscrupulous attorneys gaining undue publicity by simply demanding outrageous damages numbers that they cannot possibly prove at trial. Therefore, many such complaints cannot and do not state an amount in controversy on their face, which puts defendants in the awkward position of having to argue to the federal court that plaintiffs could theoretically recover a sum in excess of $75,000, while simultaneously maintaining that plaintiffs are not entitled to anything at all.

=== In state courts ===
Each state has the power to set its own amount in controversy requirements for its own courts, but every state must offer some outlet for citizens to sue for violations of their rights, even if they are seeking no money. Most states have several levels of trial courts, with different amount-in-controversy requirements which must be met to gain access to higher levels of courts. For example, in the state of Virginia, the lowest level of court, the Virginia General District Court has exclusive jurisdiction to hear cases where the amount in controversy is $4,500 or less, and shares authority with the Virginia Circuit Court to try cases involving sums between $4,500 and $25,000 for injury to property cases or $4,500 and $50,000 for personal injury and wrongful death cases. The Virginia Circuit Court, in turn, has exclusive jurisdiction where the amount in controversy is greater than $25,000 for injury to property cases or $50,000 for personal injury and wrongful death cases.

A few states like California have decided that it is more efficient to unify all trial courts so that judges and support staff can be more easily reassigned where needed. However, in California, nearly all lawsuits involving an amount in controversy up to $25,000 are classified as "limited civil cases," which are subject to special simplified procedural rules intended to hold down litigation costs.
