= Saadeh =

Saadeh (in سعادة) or Saadé is a common Lebanese family name based on the Arabic for happiness. Alternative ways of writing the name are Saade, Saadé and Saada.

== Persons ==
- Antun Saadeh, Lebanese-Syrian nationalist philosopher, writer and politician who founded the Syrian Social Nationalist Party
- Eric Saade, Swedish singer of Palestinian-Lebanese origin
- Georges Saadeh, Lebanese politician, former minister and former head of the Kataeb (Phalangist) party
- Jacques Saadé, Lebanese-born businessman, living in Marseille, France
- Jorge Saade, Ecuadorian violinist of Lebanese descent
- Nemer Saadé, Lebanese men's fashion designer
- Wadih Saadeh, Lebanese poet, writer, and journalist
- Rany Saadeh, German-Palestinian Mixed Martial Arts fighter
- Saadé family, Syrian family who own wineries in the Middle East
- Professor Charbel Saade, An Australian born Lebanese from Bsharri who is a world renowned Professor of Medical Imaging/Radiology

== Others ==
- Saade Vol. 1, a 2011 album by Swedish singer Eric Saade
- Saade Vol. 2, a 2011 album by Swedish singer Eric Saade and follow up to Saade Vol. 1
- Saadeh v. Farouki, a judicial case decided in the D.C. Circuit that espoused a narrow reading of existing laws in order to limit US federal diversity jurisdiction.
