= Louisville & Nashville Railroad Co. v. Mottley =

- Supreme Court of the United States

Argued October 13, 1908 Decided November 16, 1908
- Full case name: Louisville & Nashville Railroad Company v. E. L. Mottley and Annie E. Mottley
- Citations: 211 U.S. 149 (more) 29 S. Ct. 42; 53 L. Ed. 126; 1908 U.S. LEXIS 1533

Case history
- Prior: Mottley v. Louisville & Nashville R.R., 150 F. 406 (C.C.W.D. Ky. 1907)
- Subsequent: 133 Ky. 652, 118 S.W. 982 (1909); reversed, 219 U.S. 467 (1911)

Holding
- A suit arises under the Constitution and laws of the United States only when the plaintiff's statement of his own cause of action shows that it is based upon those laws or that Constitution.

Court membership
- Chief Justice Melville Fuller Associate Justices John M. Harlan · David J. Brewer; Edward D. White · Rufus W. Peckham; Joseph McKenna · Oliver W. Holmes Jr. William R. Day · William H. Moody

Case opinion
- Majority: Moody, joined by unanimous

Laws applied
- 25 Stat. 434, c. 866 (then-current federal question jurisdiction statute; current analogue 28 U.S.C. § 1331)

Louisville & Nashville Railroad Company v. Mottley, 211 U.S. 149 (1908), was a United States Supreme Court decision that held that under the existing statutory scheme, federal question jurisdiction could not be predicated on a plaintiff's anticipation that the defendant would raise a federal statute as a defense. Instead, such jurisdiction can only arise from a complaint by the plaintiff that the defendant has directly violated some provision of the Constitution, laws, or treaties of the United States. This reading of the federal question jurisdiction statute is now known as the well-pleaded complaint rule.

== Facts ==
The Mottleys, Erasmus and Annie, were a husband and wife who had been injured in a train wreck on September 7, 1871, in Jefferson County, Kentucky. In exchange for releasing the railroad from liability, they were compensated with free passes from the Louisville and Nashville Railroad company, which were to be renewed annually. Several decades later, in the Hepburn Act (1906), the U.S. Congress banned certain types of free passes starting from January 1, 1907, in order to prevent them from being used to bribe government officials, and the railroad refused to renew the Mottleys' passes in 1907. The Mottleys sued for specific performance of the rail passes in federal court. They argued that either the federal statute did not apply because they had been issued the passes decades before the law went into effect, or if the law did apply, that it was unconstitutional because it deprived them of their property (the passes). The lower federal courts decided in favor of the Mottleys, and the railroad appealed to the U.S. Supreme Court.

== Issue ==
The Supreme Court, sua sponte, questioned the existence of subject matter jurisdiction, transforming the issue into whether this was a case that could have been brought in federal court in the first place.

== Opinion of the Court ==
The Supreme Court, in an opinion by Justice Moody, dismissed the case for lack of jurisdiction. There was no diversity of citizenship, and no grounds for federal question jurisdiction where the Mottleys only sought to have their contracts enforced. They anticipated that federal questions might be raised in defense against their suit, concerning the Hepburn Act, but that was insufficient to satisfy the federal question requirement. The only way a party can get federal question jurisdiction is if the federal question arises in the plaintiff's well-pleaded complaint.

This holding was an interpretation of jurisdictional statutes rather than of the Constitution's Article III. That is, "arising under" for Article III purposes is broader than the well-pleaded complaint rule. It is well-established that Congress may grant lower federal courts less than the totality of Article III's possible federal question jurisdiction; for example, before 1980, federal question jurisdiction had an amount in controversy requirement, similar to the requirement that still exists in diversity cases. By analogy, jurisdiction premised on diversity of citizenship in Article III is broader than the modern "total diversity" requirement under the jurisdictional statute, 28 U.S.C. § 1332. For example, the Class Action Fairness Act allows federal jurisdiction based on diversity of citizenship without total diversity; this is based on Article III's broader sweep.

== Later developments ==
Following the dismissal of their case, the Mottleys brought a similar action in Kentucky state court. The state court held for them, and ordered the railroad to issue the passes. The railroad appealed to the Court of Appeals of Kentucky, Kentucky's highest court at the time, and lost. The railroad appealed again to the U.S. Supreme Court, which ruled in favor of the railroad, thereby handing the Mottleys yet another legal defeat.
