= International Insurance Co. v. Duryee =

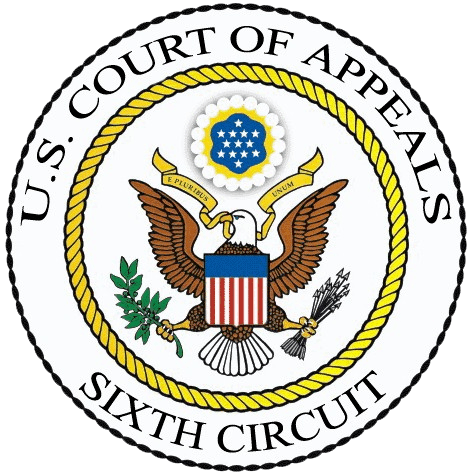
- Court: United States Court of Appeals for the Sixth Circuit
- Full case name: International Insurance Company v. Harold T. Duryee, et al
- Argued: June 6, 1996
- Decided: September 24, 1996
- Citations: 96 F.3d 837; 65 USLW 2231

Case history
- Prior history: 55 F. Supp. 2d 799 (S.D. Ohio 1999)

Court membership
- Judges sitting: Gilbert S. Merritt Jr., R. Guy Cole Jr., Patrick J. Duggan (E.D. Mich.)

Case opinions
- Majority: Merritt, joined by a unanimous court

Keywords
- Removal jurisdiction

International Insurance Co. v. Duryee, 96 F.3d 837 (6th Cir. 1996), was a case decided by the United States Court of Appeals for the Sixth Circuit that held unconstitutional a statute enacted by the Ohio legislature that sought to discourage removal jurisdiction.

== Decision ==
To limit removal jurisdiction pursuant to 28 U.S.C. §1441, the Ohio legislature enacted a statute that barred any out-of-state insurance company from doing business in the state for three years if the insurer removed a case to federal court. The Sixth Circuit held that the statute was unconstitutional.
