= Saadeh v. Farouki =

- Court: United States Court of Appeals for the District of Columbia Circuit
- Full case name: Rafic Saadeh v. Fawaz Farouki
- Argued: September 26, 1996
- Decided: March 4, 1997
- Citation: 107 F.3d 52

Court membership
- Judges sitting: Karen L. Henderson, Judith W. Rogers, David S. Tatel

Case opinions
- Majority: Rogers, joined by unanimous

Laws applied
- 28 U.S.C. § 1332(a)

Saadeh v. Farouki, 107 F.3d 52 (D.C. Cir. 1997), was a case decided in the D.C. Circuit that espoused a narrow reading of 28 U.S.C. § 1332(a) in order to limit federal diversity jurisdiction.

== Factual background ==
Saadeh, a Greek citizen living in Maryland, sued Farouki, a Jordanian citizen with permanent resident status in Maryland, over an unpaid debt in federal court. The district court found for Saadeh, and Farouki appealed on the merits.

== Decision ==
The court reversed the judgment, citing that the lower federal court lacked jurisdiction because of a lack of diversity. The court reasoned that 28 U.S.C. §1332(a) was not intended to allow federal jurisdiction over a suit between two non-citizens.
