= Removal jurisdiction =

Aspect of US law

In the United States, removal jurisdiction allows a defendant in certain circumstances to move a civil action or criminal case filed by a plaintiff in a state court to the United States district court in the federal judicial district in which the state court is located. A federal statute governs removal.

Generally, removal jurisdiction exists only if, at the time plaintiff filed the action in state court, the federal court had a basis for exercising subject-matter jurisdiction over the action, such as diversity of citizenship of the parties or where plaintiff's action involves a claim under federal law. If removal is based solely on diversity of citizenship, removal jurisdiction does not exist if any properly joined and served defendant is a citizen of the state in which the action is pending.

Where removal jurisdiction exists, the defendant may remove the action to federal court by filing a notice of removal in the federal district court within 30 days after receiving the complaint. The defendant must file a copy of the notice of removal in the state court and must notify all other parties of the removal. In a case with more than one named defendant, normally all defendants who have been served with legal process must join in the notice of removal.

If the party contends that removal was improper, based on any ground other than that the federal district court lacks subject matter jurisdiction, the party may move the district court to remand the case to state court within 30 days after the defendant filed the notice of removal. The district court will grant the motion if it finds that removal was improper. If the district court determines that it lacks subject matter jurisdiction at any time before entry of final judgment, the district court must remand the action to the state court.

The Class Action Fairness Act of 2005 creates a separate basis for defendants to remove specified class actions filed in a state court to a federal district court.

== History ==
The Judiciary Act of 1789 initially provided for removal jurisdiction. The Jurisdiction and Removal Act of 1875 explicitly granted federal courts jurisdiction over questions arising under federal law. The Judiciary Act of 1887 limited removal to defendants and established the well pleaded complaint requirement for removal.

== Removal and complete diversity ==
When there are multiple defendants in a case, if even just one is a citizen of the state where the lawsuit was filed, a plaintiff can successfully object to removal if the only basis for federal jurisdiction is based on diversity of citizenship. The reason for the rule is that diversity jurisdiction was created by the Founding Fathers of the United States in the Constitution to shield defendants from possible discrimination in a foreign forum (i.e., a state not their home state). When an in-state defendant is being sued in a state court, it is expected that he will not be subject to unfair prejudice. With the exception of class actions under CAFA, every defendant must agree to remove; otherwise, the plaintiff or non-removing defendants can request remand for failure to satisfy the "rule of unanimity".

Notably, there is a circuit split (and several intracircuit splits) over whether every defendant named in the complaint must join in the removal notice, or whether the rule of unanimity applies only to those defendants who have been properly served as of the date of removal. The reason this is important is that sometimes a plaintiff may not be able to (or may deliberately choose not to) formally serve all defendants on the same day, or some defendants may become aware of the existence of the complaint before it is formally served (for example, if other already-served defendants send them a "courtesy copy"). In courts that adhere to the latter rule, removal jurisdiction may be proper as long as defendants can show that all defendants who were properly served by the date of removal joined in the removal notice, even though not all named defendants joined in the notice.

A plaintiff may never remove its own case, even if the defendant files counterclaims alleging violations of federal law by the plaintiff. A plaintiff must seek a dismissal without prejudice and refile in federal court.

There exists a small set of cases (e.g., workers' compensation actions and actions under the Federal Employers Liability Act) that are barred from removal under all circumstances.

== Removal of cases involving federal agencies or federal officers ==
Removal jurisdiction in cases involving federal agencies or officers who are named as defendants in civil suits or criminally prosecuted is also governed by 28 U.S.C. § 1442, known as the federal-officer removal statute, as well as removal under 28 U.S.C. § 1446.

In the wording of section 1442, the law provides that in the case of federal agencies or officers, the federal district court need not otherwise have subject-matter jurisdiction over the type of case presented so long as the federal officer was acting under color of office in a civil matter, or in a criminal matter, was acting under authority granted by Congress for apprehension of criminals or collection of monies. It allows removal of state criminal cases where the defendant is a federal officer who alleges that the act was committed in carrying out his federal duties. Under this, a number of state criminal cases have been removed to federal court and there summarily dismissed, thus preventing trial on the merits of whether the officer or agent was in fact carrying out his official duties, or acting outside of them. A famous example of such a removal was the case of Idaho v. Lon Horiuchi, alleged to have committed manslaughter of Vicki Weaver in the Ruby Ridge encounter. A statute dating back to 1815 is the earliest analogue of this.

Under section 1446, on the other hand, there must be federal subject-matter jurisdiction to justify removal. The Supreme Court case BP P.L.C. v. Mayor and City Council of Baltimore (2021) resolved a circuit split on how appellate sources may review challenges to federal-officer removal orders.

== Timeliness of removal ==
When defendants want to remove, they ordinarily must do so within 30 days of receiving the complaint, "through service or otherwise", under 28 U.S.C. § 1446(b). An exception applies if diversity jurisdiction, and thus removal jurisdiction, is lacking at the time of the initial pleading in state court, but becomes available within a year after initiation of the suit. In such case, defendants may remove under 28 U.S.C. §1446(b) (second paragraph). For example, a federal court would not initially have removal jurisdiction over claims under state law brought by a Texas citizen against another Texas citizen and a New York citizen. However, should the Texas defendant be dropped from the claim, the New York citizen can remove if one year has not passed since the initiation of the suit. Some courts permit equitable tolling of the one-year limitation of §1446(b) if the original complaint was an attempt in bad faith to evade federal jurisdiction.

Defendants may remove state law claims for which a federal court has only supplemental jurisdiction, if they share a common nucleus of operative fact with claims based on federal law. The federal court has the discretion to accept the case as a whole or remand the issues of state law, however the court must apply state substantive law to state law claims, as opposed to federal law—a practice which is in-line to actions brought under 42 U.S.C. 1983.

== Other issues ==
State courts do not adjudicate whether an action could be properly removed. As soon as a defendant completes the removal process by filing a notice of removal in the state court, jurisdiction is transferred automatically and immediately by operation of law from the state court to the federal court. Any objection to removal must be presented to the federal court by way of a timely-filed motion. Apart from motions brought by the parties, many federal district courts screen notices of removal for facially obvious defects and when they catch one will issue a sua sponte order to show cause directed to the moving defendant. If a federal court finds that the notice of removal was in fact defective, or that the federal court does not have jurisdiction, the case is remanded to the state court.

A defendant used to have to formally petition the federal court for the right to remove, and jurisdiction was not transferred until the federal court entered a formal order to that effect. The petition procedure was abolished around 1980 by Congress and replaced with the simple filing-of-notice removal procedure, although federal courts still see the occasional petition for removal or a motion for remand due to the lack of such a petition.

There is no reverse "removal". That is, if a case originates in a federal court, there is no ability for a defendant to remove a case from federal court into state court. If the federal court lacks jurisdiction, the case is dismissed. Only cases that originate in a state court and are improperly removed to a federal court may be sent back to the state court where they started.

A defendant can waive the right to remove by contract, although courts take different positions about what language is necessary to create a waiver.

Remand orders are not generally appealable, but may be appealed in the case of removals brought under the Class Action Fairness Act of 2005 or where the Federal Deposit Insurance Corporation appeals a remand order under 12 U.S.C. § 1819(b)(2)(C). An alleged waiver of removal rights is also appealable, since the issue is not jurisdiction but the legal effect of the defendant's actions and agreements.

== See also ==
- International Insurance Co. v. Duryee (1996)
