= United States v. Hooe =

- Supreme Court of the United States
- Full case name: The United States of America v. T.R. Hooe & Others
- Citations: 5 U.S. 318 (more) 1 Cranch 318; 2 L. Ed. 121; 1803 U.S. LEXIS 364

Case history
- Subsequent: 7 U.S. (3 Cranch) 73 (1805)

Case opinion
- Per curiam

Laws applied
- District of Columbia Organic Act of 1801

United States v. Hooe, 5 U.S. (Cranch 1) 318 (1803), is a case of the Supreme Court of the United States. It was a case that hinged mainly on procedural issues relating to the documents that must accompany an appeal from courts within the District of Columbia.

== Background of the case ==
The Supreme Court had already ruled in Jennings v. The Perseverance, 3 U.S. (3 Dall.) 336 (1797) that the writs of error must be accompanied by a factual record. The act of Congress 27 February 1801, creating the District of Columbia held that, writs should be prosecuted in the same manner as had been the case of writs of error on judgments or appeals upon orders or decrees rendered in the circuit court of the United States.

== The decision ==
The court held that the act of congress and the prior precedent, when taken together meant that all appeals from the District of Columbia must be accompanied by a statement of facts.

== See also ==
- List of United States Supreme Court cases, volume 5
- Robert T. Hooe
- Hooe v. United States
