= Supplemental jurisdiction =

Supplemental jurisdiction, also sometimes known as ancillary jurisdiction or pendent jurisdiction, is the authority of United States federal courts to hear additional claims substantially related to the original claim even though the court would lack the subject-matter jurisdiction to hear the additional claims independently. 28 U.S.C. § 1367 is a codification of the Supreme Court's rulings on ancillary jurisdiction (Owen Equipment & Erection Co. v. Kroger, 437 U.S. 365 (1978)) and pendent jurisdiction (United Mine Workers of America v. Gibbs, 383 U.S. 715 (1966)) and a superseding of the Court's treatment of pendent party jurisdiction (Finley v. United States, 490 U.S. 545 (1989)).

Historically there was a distinction between pendent jurisdiction and ancillary jurisdiction. But, under the ruling in Exxon, that distinction is no longer meaningful. Supplemental jurisdiction refers to the various ways a federal court may hear either: state law claims, claims from parties who lack the amount in controversy requirement of diversity jurisdiction, when defendants are joined in claims, or when multiple plaintiffs are joined in claims, like in class action suits.

== Definition ==
By default, courts have supplemental jurisdiction over "all other claims that are so related . . . that they form part of the same case or controversy." The true test being that the new claim "arises from the same set of operative facts." This means a federal court hearing a federal claim can also hear substantially related state law claims, thereby encouraging efficiency by only having one trial at the federal level rather than one trial in federal court and another in state court. However, if the case is brought as a diversity action (i.e., the basis for federal jurisdiction is that each defendant comes from a state different from each plaintiff), there generally is no supplemental jurisdiction if such claims would destroy complete diversity. See Exxon Mobil Corp. v. Allapattah Services, Inc. Courts are also free to decline to exercise supplemental jurisdiction in specified or exceptional circumstances (§ 1367(c)).

== Pendent jurisdiction ==
Pendent jurisdiction is the authority of a United States federal court to hear a closely related state law claim against a party already facing a federal claim, described by the Supreme Court as "jurisdiction over nonfederal claims between parties litigating other matters properly before the court." Such jurisdiction is granted to encourage both "economy in litigation", and fairness by eliminating the need for a separate federal and state trial hearing essentially the same facts yet potentially reaching opposite conclusions.

Pendent jurisdiction refers to the court's authority to adjudicate claims it could not otherwise hear. The related concept of pendent party jurisdiction by contrast is the court's authority to adjudicate claims against a party not otherwise under the court's jurisdiction because the claim arises from the same nucleus of facts as another claim properly before the court.

The leading case on pendent jurisdiction is United Mine Workers of America v. Gibbs, 383 U.S. 715 (1966). Gibbs has been read to require that (1) there must be a federal claim (whether from the Constitution, federal statute, or treaty) and (2) the non-federal claim arises "from a common nucleus of operative fact" such that a plaintiff "would ordinarily be expected to try them in one judicial proceeding."

The holding in Gibbs has been essentially codified by Congress along with ancillary jurisdiction in 28 U.S.C. § 1367, its supplemental jurisdiction statute. However, Subsection §1367(c)(3) expressly authorizes the district court to dismiss a supplemental claim when the district court has dismissed all claims over which it has original jurisdiction.

== Ancillary jurisdiction ==
Ancillary jurisdiction is a form of supplemental jurisdiction that allows a United States federal court to hear non-federal claims sufficiently logically dependent on a federal "anchor claim" (i.e., a federal claim serving as the basis for supplemental jurisdiction), despite that such courts would otherwise lack jurisdiction over such claims. Ancillary jurisdiction differs from pendent jurisdiction in that pendent jurisdiction requires the federal and non-federal claims to arise from a "common nucleus of operative fact," (per United Mine Workers of America v. Gibbs) not to be logically interdependent. Like pendent jurisdiction, a federal court can exercise ancillary jurisdiction if the anchor claim has original federal jurisdiction either through federal-question jurisdiction or diversity jurisdiction.

Areas where ancillary jurisdiction can be asserted include counterclaims (Fed. R. Civ. P. 13), cross-claims (Fed. R. Civ. P. 13), impleader (Fed. R. Civ. P. 14), interpleader (Fed. R. Civ. P. 22) and interventions (Fed. R. Civ. P. 24). Impleader claims are a paradigmatic example of ancillary jurisdiction, given the tendency of such claims to arise under state contract law, but be entirely dependent on the original claim.

Moore v. New York Cotton Exchange and Owen Equipment & Erection Co. v. Kroger are seminal cases relating to ancillary jurisdiction.

Ancillary jurisdiction has been replaced entirely by supplemental jurisdiction, per 28 U.S.C. § 1367(b), part of the U.S. supplemental jurisdiction statute.

== Case law ==
- Szendrey-Ramos v. First Bancorp (D.P.R. 2007)
