= Coupon settlement =

In law, a coupon settlement is a resolution between disputing parties in a class action lawsuit, reached either before or after court action begins. In a coupon settlement, class members receive coupons or other promises for products or services instead of a cash award. Coupon settlements are recognised in state and federal courts in the United States.

== Criticism ==
Coupon settlements have been used as a way for a defendant to forestall major liability by precluding a large number of people from litigating their claims separately to recover reasonable compensation for the damages.

However, existing law requires judicial approval of all coupon settlements, and in most cases, class members are given a chance to opt out of class settlement, though class members, despite opt-out notices, may be unaware of their right to opt out because they did not receive the notice, did not read it, or did not understand it.

The Class Action Fairness Act of 2005 (CAFA) addresses some of those concerns. Coupon settlements may be audited by an independent expert before judicial approval to ensure that the settlement will be of value to the class members (28 U.S.C.A. 1712(d)).

In the United States, federal courts must hold a hearing and make specific findings that the coupon settlement is fair, reasonable, and adequate and that the class members' interests are represented. The following can be taken into consideration during the hearing:

1. The strength of the class member's case.
2. The risk, expense, complexity, and duration of further litigation.
3. The risk of maintaining class action status.
4. The amount offered to each class member in settlement.
5. The form of the settlement (coupons, checks, replacement products, or services).
6. The amount offered in total in settlement.
7. The extent of the discovery that has been completed.
8. The experience of counsel.
9. The presence of a governmental participant.
10. The reaction of class members to the proposed settlement.

Another criticism has been that plaintiffs' lawyers involved in coupon settlements receive cash fees in amounts that generally dwarf the award recovered by individual class members.

== See also ==
- Settlement (disambiguation)
