= Ad quod damnum =

Latin phrase

Ad quod damnum or ad damnum is a Latin phrase meaning "according to the harm" or "appropriate to the harm". It is used in tort law as a measure of damage inflicted, and implying a remedy, if one exists, ought to correspond specifically and only to the damage suffered. It is also used in pleading, as the statement of the plaintiff's money loss or damages claimed. An ad damnum clause is also sometimes called a "prayer for relief."

Several U.S. states prohibit plaintiffs from demanding a specific amount of money in the ad damnum section of a complaint initiating a civil action for personal injury or wrongful death. This is to prevent unethical attorneys from gaining undue publicity for their cases (and trampling upon defendants' right to a fair trial) by demanding outrageous amounts that they cannot possibly prove at trial. This is why such complaints simply demand amounts "in excess of $[X]" (where X is the minimum amount in controversy necessary to get into the trial court of general jurisdiction), "pecuniary loss", or "monetary damages in an amount according to proof." Of course, at some point the defendant needs to get some idea of what amount of money the plaintiff actually wants, so the defendant can usually serve interrogatories directed to that issue or a formal request for a statement of damages as part of the discovery process.

== See also ==
- Damndum absque injuria
