= GPSolo Magazine =

GPSolo Magazine is a legal magazine published bimonthly by the Solo, Small Firm and General Practice Division (GPSolo) of the American Bar Association (ABA). The magazine is based in Chicago, Illinois.

== History and profile ==
The magazine began its existence under the name The Compleat Lawyer in 1983. GPSolo is devoted to themes of critical importance to lawyers practicing in solo and small firms. Members of the ABA's General Practice, Solo and Small Firm Division receive complimentary subscriptions to GPSolo as one of the benefits of Division membership. Subscriptions are available to nonmembers at a cost of $48 per year or $9.50 per copy.

The popular biannual Technology and Practice Guide features reviews of new technology relevant to the particular needs of general, solo, and small firm lawyers. The magazine also publishes two Best of Sections issues each year featuring top articles from ABA practice group publications.

The remaining issues of the magazine are generally "theme" issues, each concentrating on one general subject area. Areas addressed in recent issues include animal law, the law of leisure, sex and the law, privacy and the law, child welfare, old, big, small, law of learning, internet law, family law, estate planning, risky business, rainmaking, ethics and professionalism, and the care and feeding of clients.

Long-time editor-in-chief Jennifer J. Rose guided the magazine from 1995 until 2007, when Joan Burda assumed the editor-in-chief position. Rose resumed responsibilities as editor-in-chief in August, 2010, retiring in August, 2011. Jeff Allen took over the role of editor-in-chief after Rose left. His regular column, Road Warrior, is still featured in the magazine now. He stayed in this role until August 2019. Cedric Ashley took over the helm as editor-in-chief from August 2019 to August 2021. Since then, Julie T. Houth has been editor-in-chief. She is the youngest appointed editor-in-chief of the magazine and is the first Asian-American woman in this role. Her regular editor’s column, The Legal Angle, is featured in every issue of the magazine since she took over. Formerly published eight times per year, the frequency of GPSolo is bimonthly.
