= Strawbridge v. Curtiss =

- Supreme Court of the United States

Argued February 12, 1806 Decided February 13, 1806
- Full case name: Strawbridge, et al. v. Curtiss, et al.
- Citations: 7 U.S. 267 (more) 3 Cranch 267; 2 L. Ed. 435; 1806 WL 1213 (U.S.Mass.)

Holding
- A controversy is not "between citizens of different states" so as to give jurisdiction to the federal courts unless all the persons on one side of it are citizens of different states from all the persons on the other side.

Court membership
- Chief Justice John Marshall Associate Justices William Cushing · William Paterson; Samuel Chase · Bushrod Washington; William Johnson

Case opinion
- Majority: Marshall, joined by unanimous

Laws applied
- Judiciary Act of 1789

Strawbridge v. Curtiss, 7 U.S. (3 Cranch) 267 (1806), was a case in which the Supreme Court of the United States first addressed the question of complete diversity for diversity jurisdiction.

In a 158-word opinion the Court held that for federal diversity jurisdiction, under section 11 of the Judiciary Act of 1789, no party on one side of a suit may be a citizen of the same state as any party on the other side. Therefore, when there are joint plaintiffs or defendants, jurisdiction must be established as to each party. That requirement remains acceptable in law as a matter of statutory interpretation, not constitutional command.

== See also ==
- List of United States Supreme Court cases, volume 7
