= Class Action Fairness Act of 2005 =

United States federal legislation

- Long title: An Act to amend the procedures that apply to consideration of interstate class actions to assure fairer outcomes for class members and defendants, and for other purposes.
- Enacted by: the 109th United States Congress

Citations
- Public law: Pub. L. 109–2 (text) (PDF)
- Statutes at Large: 119 Stat. 4–14

Legislative history
- Introduced in the Senate as S. 5 by Chuck Grassley (R–IA) on January 25, 2005; Committee consideration by Senate Judiciary; Passed the Senate on February 10, 2005 (72–26); Passed the House on February 17, 2005 (279-149); Signed into law by President George W. Bush on February 18, 2005

The Class Action Fairness Act of 2005, 28 U.S.C. §§ 1332(d), 1453, 1711–15, is a U.S. federal statute which expanded federal subject-matter jurisdiction over many large class action lawsuits and mass actions in the United States.

The bill was the first major piece of legislation of the second term of the George W. Bush administration. Business groups and tort reform supporters had lobbied for the legislation, arguing that it was needed to prevent class action abuse. President George W. Bush had vowed to support this legislation.

The Act permits federal courts to preside over certain class actions in diversity jurisdiction where the aggregate amount in controversy exceeds $5 million; where the class comprises at least 100 plaintiffs; and where there is at least "minimal diversity" between the parties (i.e., at least one plaintiff class member is diverse from at least one defendant). The court, however, may decline jurisdiction under certain circumstances and is required to decline jurisdiction in others. The Act also directs the courts to give greater scrutiny to class action settlements, especially those involving corporations.

== Support ==
The Act accomplished two key goals of tort reform advocates:

1. Reduce "forum shopping" by plaintiffs in friendly state courts by extending federal diversity jurisdiction to class actions where there is not "complete diversity", thereby giving federal subject-matter jurisdiction over a broader set of class actions. Proponents argued that "magnet jurisdictions" such as Madison County, Illinois were rife with abuse of class action procedure.
2. Requires greater federal scrutiny procedures for the review of class action settlements and changes the rules for evaluating coupon settlements, often reducing attorney's fees that are deemed excessive relative to the benefits actually afforded class members. For example, in an infamous Alabama class action involving Bank of Boston, attorneys' fees exceeded the relief to class members, and class members lost money paying attorneys for the "victory."

The Act passed the Senate 72 to 26, with all 53 Republicans voting in favor, and the Act passed the House 279 to 149, with the support of 50 Democrats and all but one Republican. President George W. Bush signed the Act into law on February 18, 2005.

== Critics ==
Critics charged that the legislation would deprive Americans of legal recourse when they were wronged by powerful corporations. Congressman Ed Markey (D-Mass.) called the bill "the final payback to the tobacco industry, to the asbestos industry, to the oil industry, to the chemical industry at the expense of ordinary families who need to be able go to court to protect their loved ones when their health has been compromised."

Critics charge that this bill makes it far more difficult to bring class action suits, and may prolong such litigation, clogging federal court dockets. The Act also gives the federal government some ability to control, through judicial appointments, outcomes that were previously under state control.

Critics argue that the expansion of federal jurisdiction comes at the expense of state's rights and federalism, something Republicans have historically protested; however, proponents respond that the bill is consistent with the founders' original intent for the role of federal courts and diversity jurisdiction expressed by Alexander Hamilton in Federalist No. 80.

== Impact ==
A study by researchers at the Federal Judicial Center found that CAFA was followed by an increase in the number of class actions filed in or removed to the federal courts based on diversity jurisdiction. This finding is consistent with congressional intent in enacting CAFA. The observed increase was due primarily to increases in consumer class actions. Somewhat surprisingly, the FJC study found much of the increase in diversity class actions was driven by an increase in original filings in federal courts. This finding suggests plaintiffs' attorneys are choosing the federal forum, post-CAFA, rather than defendants' counsel through removal, contrary to expectations.

== See also ==
- Tort reform
