= Subject-matter jurisdiction =

Type of jurisdictional court authority

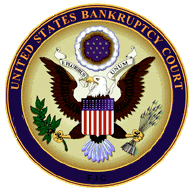
Seal of the United States Bankruptcy Court, which has subject-matter jurisdiction over bankruptcy cases

Subject-matter jurisdiction, also called jurisdiction ratione materiae, is a legal doctrine regarding the ability of a court to lawfully hear and adjudicate a case. Subject-matter relates to the nature of a case; whether it is criminal, civil, whether it is a state issue or a federal issue, and other substantive features of the case. Courts must have subject-matter jurisdiction over the particular case in order to hear it. A court is given the ability to hear a case by a foundational document, usually a Constitution. Courts are granted either general jurisdiction or limited jurisdiction, depending on their type. For example, in the US, state courts have general jurisdiction over the affairs within their state. That means, for most cases, subject-matter jurisdiction of the state courts covers nearly all subjects within that state, such as family law, state criminal law, state civil claims, state tort claims, etc. That power is usually vested in the state courts by their state Constitution. Limited jurisdiction, by contrast, would mean a court does not have jurisdiction over any given case unless specific conditions are met. US federal courts are courts of limited jurisdiction, as specific conditions, as outlined in 28 USC 1332, must be met before a federal court can hear a case.

Subject-matter jurisdiction must be distinguished from personal jurisdiction, which is the power of a court to render a judgment against a particular defendant, and territorial jurisdiction, which is the power of the court to render a judgment concerning events that have occurred within a well-defined territory. Unlike personal or territorial jurisdiction, lack of subject-matter jurisdiction cannot be waived. A judgment from a court that did not have subject-matter jurisdiction is forever a nullity. To decide a case, a court must have a combination of subject (subjectam) and either personal (personam) or territorial (locum) jurisdiction.

Subject-matter jurisdiction, personal or territorial jurisdiction, and adequate notice are the three most fundamental constitutional requirements for a valid judgment.

== United States ==
=== General jurisdiction vs. limited jurisdiction ===
The subject matter jurisdiction of state courts and federal courts in the United States often overlaps. Many types of cases can be heard either in state or federal courts. However, the federal courts are all courts of limited jurisdiction, while most states have both courts of limited jurisdiction and courts of general jurisdiction.

=== State courts ===
Most U.S. state court systems include a superior court that has "general" jurisdiction; that is, it is competent to hear any case over which no other state or federal court has exclusive jurisdiction. (Superior Courts might nonetheless organize themselves into specialized departments or divisions, the court as a whole still has general jurisdiction.) Because the percentage of claims over which the United States federal courts have exclusive jurisdiction, such as copyright disputes, patent disputes, and United States bankruptcy court disputes, makes up a small percentage of overall cases, state courts have the authority to hear the vast majority state and federal of cases.

=== U.S. federal courts ===
Subject-matter jurisdiction is significantly more limited in United States federal courts. The maximal constitutional bounds of federal courts' subject-matter jurisdiction are defined by Article III Section 2 of the U.S. Constitution. Federal courts' actual subject-matter jurisdiction derives from Congressional enabling statutes, such as 28 U.S.C. §§ 1330–1369 and 28 U.S.C. §§ 1441–1452. The United States Congress has not extended federal courts' subject-matter jurisdiction to its constitutional limits. For example, the amount-in-controversy requirement for diversity jurisdiction is based on 28 U.S.C. § 1332, not a constitutional restriction. Moreover, Congress could constitutionally overrule the complete diversity rule in diversity cases, which predominantly holds that each plaintiff must be a citizen of a different state than each defendant.

The two primary categories of federal subject-matter jurisdiction in civil cases are federal question jurisdiction and diversity jurisdiction. The enabling statute for federal question jurisdiction, 28 U.S.C. § 1331, provides that the district courts have original jurisdiction in all civil actions arising under the Constitution, laws, or treaties of the United States. As mentioned before, this jurisdiction by default is not exclusive; states can also hear claims based on federal law. The enabling statute for diversity jurisdiction, 28 U.S.C. § 1332, grants the district courts jurisdiction in a most types of actions, so long as they meet two basic conditions:

- Complete diversity requirement. No defendant is a citizen of the same state as any plaintiff.
- Amount in controversy requirement. The matter in controversy exceeds $75,000.

Federal courts separately may exert diversity jurisdiction over class action cases so long as they meet the jurisdictional requirements of the Class Action Fairness Act of 2005, namely:

- Minimal diversity. At least one member of the class is a citizen of a different state than at least one defendant.
- Amount in controversy requirement. The matter in controversy exceeds $5 million.

Federal courts also have removal jurisdiction, which is the authority to try cases removed by defendants from state courts. The contours of removal jurisdiction are almost identical to those of original jurisdiction.

According to Rule 12(b)(1) of the Federal Rules of Civil Procedure, a federal court has the authority to dismiss a case for lack of subject-matter jurisdiction upon motion of a party or sua sponte, upon its own initiative.

In federal criminal cases (offenses against the laws of the United States), the federal district courts of the United States have subject matter jurisdiction granted under 18 U.S.C. § 3231.

== See also ==
- General jurisdiction (Ordinary court)
- Limited jurisdiction (Specialized court)
