= Involuntary dismissal =

Involuntary dismissal is the termination of a court case despite the plaintiff's objection.

In United States federal courts, involuntary dismissal is governed by Federal Rules of Civil Procedure (FRCP) Rule 41(b).

Involuntary dismissal is made by a defendant through a motion for dismissal, on grounds that plaintiff is not prosecuting the case, is not complying with a court order, or to comply with the Federal Rules of Civil Procedure.

Involuntary dismissal can also be made by order of the judge when no defendant has made a motion to dismiss. Involuntary dismissal is a punishment that courts may use when a party to a case is not acting properly. Other punishments are found in FRCP Rule 11, Federal Rules of Appellate Procedure Rule 38, sections 1927 and 1912 of Title 28 United States Code, and inherent powers of the court.

Involuntary dismissal bars the case from being brought to court again, unless the judge says otherwise.

State court rules may be different from the Federal rules and vary from state to state.

== See also ==
- Voluntary dismissal
