= Federal question jurisdiction =

Type of U.S. court subject-matter jurisdiction

In United States law, federal question jurisdiction is a type of subject-matter jurisdiction that gives United States federal courts the power to hear civil cases where the plaintiff alleges a violation of the United States Constitution, federal law, or a treaty to which the United States is a party. The federal question jurisdiction statute is codified at 28 U.S.C. § 1331.

== Statute ==
The district courts shall have original jurisdiction of all civil actions arising under the Constitution, laws, or treaties of the United States.

— 28 U.S.C. § 1331.

== Overview ==
Article III of the United States Constitution permits federal courts to hear such cases, so long as the United States Congress passes a statute to that effect. However, when Congress passed the Judiciary Act of 1789, which authorized the newly created federal courts to hear such cases, it initially chose not to allow the lower federal courts to possess federal question jurisdiction for fear that it would make the courts too powerful. The Federalists briefly created such jurisdiction in the Judiciary Act of 1801, but it was repealed the following year, and not restored until 1875.

Unlike diversity jurisdiction, which is based on the parties coming from different states, federal question jurisdiction no longer has any amount in controversy requirement. Congress eliminated the requirement in actions against the United States in 1976 and in all federal question cases in 1980. Therefore, a federal court can hear a federal question case even if no money is sought by the plaintiff.

To meet the requirement of a case "arising under" federal law, the federal question must appear on the face of the plaintiff's complaint. There has been considerable dispute over what constitutes a "federal question" in these circumstances, but it is now settled law that the plaintiff cannot seek the jurisdiction of a federal court merely because it anticipates that the defendant is going to raise a defense based on the Constitution, or on a federal statute. This "well-pleaded complaint" rule has been criticized by legal scholars, but Congress has so far chosen not to change the law, although the Supreme Court has made clear it is free to do so.

== Related cases ==
Eight years after Louisville & Nashville Railroad Company v. Mottley, Justice Oliver Wendell Holmes established the Holmes Test in American Well Works Co. v. Layne & Bowler Co. The opinion delivered for the court included the phrase: "A suit arises under the law that creates the cause of action." For almost a hundred years this test was the foundation for federal question qualification under § 1331 until the Supreme Court modified it in Mims v. Arrow Financial Services (2012) to be whether “federal law creates [both] a private right of action and furnishes the substantive rules of decision.”

== See also ==
- Diversity jurisdiction
- Supplemental jurisdiction
- Louisville & Nashville Railroad Co. v. Mottley
