= Judicial economy =

Judicial economy or procedural economy is the principle that the limited resources of the legal system or a given court should be conserved by the refusal to decide one or more claims raised in a case. For example, the plaintiff may claim that the defendant's actions violated three distinct laws. Having found for the plaintiff for a violation of the first law, the court then has the discretion to exercise judicial economy and refuse to make a decision on the remaining two claims, on the grounds that the finding of one violation should be sufficient to satisfy the plaintiff.

== Threshold issue in a given case ==
In the presence of a threshold issue that will ultimately decide a case, a court may, depending on the degree of prejudice to the litigants rights, elect to hear that issue rather than proceeding with a full-blown trial.

== Class action lawsuits ==
Class action lawsuits are another example of judicial economy in action, as they are often tried as a single case, yet involve many cases with similar facts. Rather than trying each case individually, which would unduly burden the judicial system, the cases can be consolidated into a class action.
