= Diversity jurisdiction =

U.S. court jurisdiction over persons of different states or nationalities

In the law of the United States, diversity jurisdiction is a form of subject-matter jurisdiction that gives United States federal courts the power to hear lawsuits that do not involve a federal question. For a federal court to have diversity jurisdiction over a lawsuit, two conditions must be met. First, there must be "diversity of citizenship" between the parties, meaning the plaintiffs must be citizens of different U.S. states than the defendants. Second, the lawsuit's "amount in controversy" must be more than $75,000. If a lawsuit does not meet these two conditions, federal courts will normally lack the jurisdiction to hear it unless it involves a federal question, and the lawsuit would need to be heard in a state court instead.

The United States Constitution, in Article III, Section 2, grants Congress the power to permit federal courts to hear diversity cases through legislation authorizing such jurisdiction. The provision was included because the Framers of the Constitution were concerned that when a case is filed in one state, and it involves parties from that state and another state, the state court might be biased toward the party from that state. Congress first exercised that power and granted federal trial circuit courts diversity jurisdiction in the Judiciary Act of 1789. Diversity jurisdiction is currently codified at 28 U.S.C. § 1332, the statute originally enacted on June 25, 1948.

In 1969, the American Law Institute explained in a 587-page analysis of the subject that diversity is the "most controversial" type of federal jurisdiction, because it "lays bare fundamental issues regarding the nature and operation of our federal union."

== Statute ==
(a) The district courts shall have original jurisdiction of all civil actions where the matter in controversy exceeds the sum or value of $75,000, exclusive of interest and costs, and is between—

(1) citizens of different States;
(2) citizens of a State and citizens or subjects of a foreign state, except that the district courts shall not have original jurisdiction under this subsection of an action between citizens of a State and citizens or subjects of a foreign state who are lawfully admitted for permanent residence in the United States and are domiciled in the same State;
(3) citizens of different States and in which citizens or subjects of a foreign state are additional parties; and
(4) a foreign state, defined in section 1603(a) of this title, as plaintiff and citizens of a State or of different States.

— 28 U.S.C. § 1332.

== Diversity of parties ==
Mostly, in order for diversity jurisdiction to apply, complete diversity is required, where none of the plaintiffs can be from the same state as any of the defendants. A corporation is treated as a citizen of the state in which it is incorporated and the state in which its principal place of business is located. A partnership or limited liability company is considered to have the citizenship of all of its constituent partners/members. Thus, an LLC or partnership with one member or partner sharing citizenship with an opposing party will destroy diversity of jurisdiction. Cities and towns (incorporated municipalities) are also treated as citizens of the states in which they are located, but states themselves are not considered citizens for the purpose of diversity. U.S. citizens are citizens of the state in which they are domiciled, which is the last state in which they resided and had an intent to remain.

A national bank chartered under the National Bank Act is treated as a citizen of the state in which it is "located". In 2006, the Supreme Court rejected an approach that would have interpreted the term "located" to mean that a national bank is a citizen of every state in which it maintains a branch. The Supreme Court concluded that "a national bank ... is a citizen of the State in which its main office, as set forth in its articles of association, is located". The Supreme Court, however, left open the possibility that a national bank may also be a citizen of the state in which it has its principal place of business, thus putting it on an equal footing with a state-formed corporation. This remains an open question, with some lower courts holding that a national bank is a citizen of only the state in which its main office is located, and others holding that a national bank is also a citizen of the state in which it has its principal place of business.

The diversity jurisdiction statute also allows federal courts to hear cases in which:

- Citizens of a U.S. state are parties on one side of the case, with nonresident alien(s) as adverse parties;
- Complete diversity exists as to the U.S. parties, and nonresident aliens are additional parties;
- A foreign state (i.e., country) is the plaintiff, and the defendants are citizens of one or more U.S. states; or
- Under the Class Action Fairness Act of 2005, a class action can usually be brought in a federal court when there is just minimal diversity, such that any plaintiff is a citizen of a different state from any defendant. Class actions that do not meet the requirement of the Class Action Fairness Act must have complete diversity between class representatives (those named in the lawsuit) and the defendants.

A U.S. citizen who is domiciled outside the U.S. is not considered to be a citizen of any U.S. state, and cannot be considered an alien. The presence of such a person as a party completely destroys diversity jurisdiction, except for a class action or mass action in which minimal diversity exists with respect to other parties in the case.

If the case requires the presence of a party who is from the same state as an opposing party, or a party who is a U.S. citizen domiciled outside the country, the case must be dismissed, the absent party being deemed "indispensable". The determination of whether a party is indispensable is made by the court following the guidelines set forth in Rule 19 of the Federal Rules of Civil Procedure.

=== Diversity is determined at the time that the action is filed ===
Diversity is determined at the time that federal court jurisdiction is invoked (at time of filing, if directly filed in U.S. district court, or at time of removal, if removed from state court), and on the basis of the state citizenships of the parties at that time. A change in domicile by a natural person before or after that date is irrelevant. However, in Caterpillar, Inc. v. Lewis (1996), the Supreme Court also held that federal jurisdiction predicated on diversity of citizenship can be sustained even if there did not exist complete diversity at the time of removal to federal court, so long as complete diversity exists at the time the district court enters judgment. The court in Caterpillar sustained diversity as an issue of "fairness" and economy, given a lower court's original mistake that allowed removal.

=== Corporate citizenship based on principal place of business ===
Before 1958, a corporation for the purpose of diversity jurisdiction was deemed to be a citizen only of the state in which it had been formally incorporated. This was originally not a problem when a corporation could be chartered only by the enacting of a private bill by the state legislature (either with the consent of the governor or over his veto). Thus, corporations were normally headquartered in the same state where they were incorporated, since their promoters had to be quite well-known and well-connected in that state in order to obtain passage of a private bill.

The traditional rule only became a problem when general incorporation laws were invented around 1896, state legislatures began a race to the bottom to attract out-of-state corporations, and corporations began to incorporate in one state (usually Delaware) but set up their headquarters in another state. During the 20th century, the traditional rule came to be seen as extremely unfair in that corporate defendants actually headquartered in a state but incorporated elsewhere could remove diversity cases against them from state courts to federal courts, while individual and unincorporated defendants physically based in that same state (e.g., partnerships) could not. Therefore, during the 1950s, various proposals were introduced to broaden the citizenship of corporations in order to reduce their access to federal courts.

In 1957, conservative Southern Democrats, as part of their larger agenda to protect racial segregation and states' rights by greatly reducing the power of the federal judiciary, introduced a bill to limit diversity jurisdiction to natural citizens. Liberals in Congress recognized this was actually a form of retaliation by conservative Southerners against the Warren Court, and prevailed in 1958 with the passage of a relatively narrow bill which deemed corporations to be citizens of both their states of incorporation and principal place of business. The two proposals, respectively, promised to reduce the federal civil caseload by 25% versus 2%.

However, Congress never defined what exactly is a "principal place of business". The original proposal for this term from the Committee on Jurisdiction and Venue of the Judicial Conference of the United States recommended that the "principal place of business" should be the state, if any, from which a corporation derived fifty percent or more of its gross income. This was severely flawed because it implied that the largest corporations which earned gross income from many states would have no principal place of business at all.

In September 1951, the committee substituted a different recommendation from the judges of the Tenth Circuit, to the effect that the term "principal place of business" should be determined according to the precedents which had interpreted this term as used in the Bankruptcy Act. This recommendation was accepted uncritically by the House and Senate committees which produced the 1958 bill. The problem with this approach was that the Bankruptcy Act precedents treated the issue as a question of fact to be decided in light of all relevant evidence, which meant that they provided virtually no guidance.

The question of what is a "principal place of business" became hotly disputed during the late 20th century as many areas of the American economy came under the control of large national corporations. Although these corporations usually had a headquarters in one state, the majority of their employees, assets, and revenue were often physically located at retail sites in the states with the largest populations, and hence a circuit split developed in which some judges held that the latter states could also be treated as the corporation's principal place of business. The rationale was that those states were where the business was actually occurring or being transacted. This issue was finally resolved by a unanimous Supreme Court in Hertz Corp. v. Friend (2010), which held that a corporation's principal place of business is presumed to be the place of the corporation's "nerve center" from where its officers conduct the corporation's important business.

== Amount in controversy ==
The United States Congress has placed an additional barrier to diversity jurisdiction: the amount in controversy requirement. This is a minimum amount of money which the parties must be contesting is owed to them. Since the enactment of the Federal Courts Improvement Act of 1996, 28 U.S.C. §1332(a) has provided that a claim for relief must exceed the sum or value of $75,000, exclusive of interest and costs and without considering counterclaims. In other words, the amount in controversy must be equal to or more than $75,000.01, and (in a case which has been removed from a state court to the federal court) a federal court must remand a case back to state court if the amount in controversy is exactly $75,000.00.

A single plaintiff may add different claims against the same defendant to meet the amount. Two plaintiffs, however, may not join their claims together to meet the amount, but if one plaintiff meets the amount standing alone, the second plaintiff can piggyback as long as the second plaintiff's claim arises out of the same facts as the main claim. More detailed information may be obtained from the article on federal supplemental jurisdiction.

The amount specified has been regularly increased over the past two centuries. Courts will use the legal certainty test to decide whether the dispute is over $75,000. Under this test, the court will accept the pled amount unless it is legally certain that the pleading party cannot recover more than $75,000. For example, if the dispute is solely over the breach of a contract by which the defendant had agreed to pay the plaintiff $10,000, a federal court will dismiss the case for lack of subject matter jurisdiction, or remand the case to state court if it arrived via removal.

In personal injury cases, plaintiffs will sometimes claim amounts "not to exceed $75,000" in their complaint to avoid removal of the case to federal court. If the amount is left unspecified in the ad damnum, as is required by the pleading rules of many states, the defendant may sometimes be able to remove the case to federal court unless the plaintiff's lawyer files a document expressly disclaiming damages in excess of the jurisdictional requirement. Because juries decide what personal injuries are worth, compensation for injuries may exceed $75,000 such that the "legal certainty" test will not bar federal court jurisdiction. Many plaintiffs' lawyers seek to avoid federal courts because of the perception that they are more hostile to plaintiffs than most state courts.

=== Domestic relations and probate exceptions ===
A longstanding judge-made rule holds that federal courts have no jurisdiction over divorce or other domestic relations cases, even if there is diversity of citizenship between the parties and the amount of money in controversy meets the jurisdictional limit. As the Supreme Court has stated, "[t]he whole subject of the domestic relations of husband and wife, parent and child, belongs to the laws of the states, and not to the laws of the United States." The court concluded "that the domestic relations exception ... divests the federal courts of power to issue divorce, alimony, and child custody decrees." In explaining this exception, the high court noted that domestic cases frequently required the issuing court to retain jurisdiction over recurring disputes in interpreting and enforcing those decrees. State courts have developed expertise in dealing with these matters, and the interest of judicial economy required keeping that litigation in the courts most experienced to handle it. However, federal courts are not limited in their ability to hear tort cases arising out of domestic situations by the doctrine.

A similar exception has been recognized for probate and decedent's estate litigation, which continues to hold for the primary cases; diversity jurisdiction does not exist to probate wills or administer decedent's estates directly. Diversity jurisdiction is allowed for some litigation that arises under trusts and other estate planning documents, however.

== Removal and remand ==
If a case is originally filed in a state court, and the requirements for federal jurisdiction are met (diversity and amount in controversy, the case involves a federal question, or a supplemental jurisdiction exists), the defendant (and only the defendant) may remove the case to a federal court.

A case cannot be removed to a state court. To remove to a federal court, the defendant must file a notice of removal with both the state court where the case was filed and the federal court to which it will be transferred. The notice of removal must be filed within 30 days of the first removable document. For example, if there is no diversity of citizenship initially, but the non-diverse defendant is subsequently dismissed, the remaining diverse defendant(s) may remove to a federal court. However, no removal is available after one year of the filing of the complaint.

A party's citizenship at the time of the filing of the action is considered the citizenship of the party. If a defendant later moves to the same state as the plaintiff while the action is pending, the federal court will still have jurisdiction. However, if any properly joined and served defendant is a citizen of the state where the action is first filed, then removal based on diversity jurisdiction is not allowed, an exception known as the "forum-defendant rule".

If a plaintiff or a co-defendant opposes removal, he may request a remand, asking the federal court to send the case back to the state court. A remand is rarely granted if the diversity and amount in controversy requirements are met. A remand may be granted, however, if a non-diverse party joins the action, or if the parties settle some claims among them, leaving the amount in controversy below the requisite amount.

== Law applied ==
The United States Supreme Court determined in Erie Railroad Co. v. Tompkins (1938) that the law to be applied in a diversity case would be the law of whatever state in which the action was filed. This decision overturned precedents that had held that federal courts could create a general federal common law, instead of applying the law of the forum state. This decision was an interpretation of the word "laws" in 28 U.S.C. 1652, known as the Rules of Decision Act, to mean not just statutes enacted by the legislature but also the common law created by state courts.

Under the Rules of Decision Act, the laws of the several states, except where the constitution or treaties of the United States or Acts of Congress otherwise require or provide, shall be regarded as rules of decision in civil actions in the courts of the United States, in cases where they apply.

The RDA provides for exceptions and modifications by Congress. The Rules Enabling Act (REA), 28 U.S.C. 2072, delegates the legislative authority to the Supreme Court to ratify rules of practice and procedure and rules of evidence for federal courts. It is not Erie, but the REA which created the distinction between substantive and procedural law.

Thus, while state substantive law is applied, the Federal Rules of Civil Procedure and the Federal Rules of Evidence still govern the "procedural" matters in a diversity action, as clarified in Gasperini v. Center for Humanities (1996). The REA, 28 U.S.C. 2072(b), provides that the Rules will not affect the substantive rights of the parties. Therefore, a federal court may still apply the "procedural" rules of the state of the initial filing, if the federal law would "abridge, enlarge, or modify" a substantive right provided for under the law of the state.

== See also ==
- Class Action Fairness Act of 2005
- Federal question jurisdiction
- Federalist No. 80
- Saadeh v. Farouki (1997)
- Strawbridge v. Curtiss (1806)
- Supplemental jurisdiction
