= Title 28 of the United States Code =

U.S. federal statutes on the federal judiciary

Title 28 (Judiciary and Judicial Procedure), also called the Judicial Code, is the portion of the United States Code (federal statutory law) that governs the federal judicial system.

It is divided into six parts:

- Part I: Organization of Courts
- Part II: Department of Justice
- Part III: Court Officers and Employees
- Part IV: Jurisdiction and Venue
- Part V: Procedure
- Part VI: Particular Proceedings

== Part I—Organization of Courts ==
The part establishes United States federal courts.

- Chapter 1: Supreme Court

Includes provisions setting the number of justices at 9 and defining a quorum as any 6, setting the terms of court, and determining salaries

- Chapter 3: Courts of Appeals

Includes provisions relating to the composition of Circuits, the creation, composition and terms of courts, and the selection and employment conditions of judges

- Chapter 5: District Courts

Describes for each state the layout of districts, divisions etc.; describes the creation and composition of courts and the selection and employment conditions of judges; provides for replacement of judges in cases of bias or prejudice

- Chapter 6: Bankruptcy judges
- Chapter 7: United States Court of Federal Claims
- Chapter 9: United States Court of Customs and Patent Appeals (repealed October 1, 1982)
- Chapter 11: Court of International Trade
- Chapter 13: Assignment of judges to other courts
- Chapter 15: Conferences and councils of judges
- Chapter 17: Resignation and retirement of justices and judges
- Chapter 19: Distribution of reports and digests
- Chapter 21: General provisions applicable to courts and judges
- Chapter 23: Civil justice expense and delay reduction plans

== Part II—Department of Justice ==
The part establishes the United States Department of Justice.

- Chapter 31: The Attorney General
  - § 530B: Ethical Standards for Government Attorneys
- Chapter 33: Federal Bureau of Investigation
- Chapter 35: United States Attorneys
- Chapter 37: United States Marshals Service
- Chapter 39: United States Trustees
- Chapter 40: Independent Counsel
- Chapter 40A: Bureau of Alcohol, Tobacco, Firearms and Explosives

== Part III—Court Officers and Employees ==
- Chapter 41: Administrative Office of United States Courts
- Chapter 42: Federal Judicial Center
- Chapter 43: United States Magistrate Judge
- Chapter 44: Alternative Dispute Resolution
- Chapter 45: Supreme Court
- Chapter 47: Courts of Appeals (also called circuit courts)
- Chapter 49: District Courts
- Chapter 50: [Omitted]
- Chapter 51: United States Court of Federal Claims (hears non-tort monetary claims against the U.S. government)
- Chapter 53: [Repealed] (United States Court of Customs and Patent Appeals)
- Chapter 55: Court of International Trade
- Chapter 57: General Provisions Applicable to Court Officers and Employees
- Chapter 58: United States Sentencing Commission

== Part IV—Jurisdiction and Venue ==
This part deals with jurisdiction and venue.

- Chapter 81: Supreme Court
- Chapter 83: Courts of Appeals
- Chapter 85: District Courts; Jurisdiction
- Chapter 87: District Courts; Venue
- Chapter 89: District Courts; Removal of Cases from State Courts
- Chapter 90: [Omitted]
- Chapter 91: United States Court of Federal Claims
- Chapter 93: [Repealed] (United States Court of Customs and Patent Appeals)
- Chapter 95: Court of International Trade
- Chapter 97: Jurisdictional Immunities of Foreign States
- Chapter 99: General Provisions

Section 1333, within Chapter 85, deals with the jurisdiction of the district courts. Admiralty or maritime jurisdiction falls to these courts but there is also a provision known as the "saving-to-suitors clause", which allows for "other remedies" such as a state court hearing.

== Part V—Procedure ==
This part establishes criminal procedure and civil procedure for the federal courts. The Supreme Court, pursuant to the Rules Enabling Act and upon recommendations from the Judicial Conference of the United States, promulgates the more detailed Federal Rules of Civil Procedure and Federal Rules of Criminal Procedure

- Chapter 111: General Provisions
- Chapter 113: Process
- Chapter 114: Class Actions
- Chapter 115: Evidence; Documentary
- Chapter 117: Evidence; Depositions
- Chapter 119: Evidence; Witnesses
- Chapter 121: Juries; Trial by Jury
- Chapter 123: Fees and Costs
- Chapter 125: Pending Actions and Judgments
- Chapter 127: Executions and Judicial Sales
- Chapter 129: Money Paid into Court
- Chapter 131: Rules of Court
- Chapter 133: Review—Miscellaneous Provisions

== Part VI—Particular Proceedings ==
- Chapter 151: Declaratory Judgments
- Chapter 153: Habeas Corpus
- Chapter 154: Special Habeas Corpus Procedures for Capital Cases
- Chapter 155: Injunctions; Three-Judge Courts
- Chapter 157: Surface Transportation Board Orders; Enforcement and Review
- Chapter 158: Orders of Federal Agencies; Review
- Chapter 159: Interpleader
- Chapter 161: United States as Party Generally
- Chapter 163: Fines, Penalties, and Forfeitures
- Chapter 165: United States Court of Federal Claims Procedure
- Chapter 167: [Repealed]
- Chapter 169: Court of International Trade Procedure
- Chapter 171: Tort Claims Procedure
- Chapter 173: Attachment in Postal Suits
- Chapter 175: [Repealed]
- Chapter 176: Federal Debt Collection Procedures
- Chapter 178: Professional and Amateur Sports Protection
- Chapter 179: Judicial Review of Certain Actions by Presidential Offices
- Chapter 180: Assumption of Certain Contractual Obligations
- Chapter 181: Foreign Judgments
- Chapter 190: Miscellaneous
