= Impleader =

Procedural device before trial

Impleader is a United States civil court procedural device before trial in which a defendant joins a third party into a lawsuit because that third party is liable to an original defendant. Using the vocabulary of the Federal Rules of Civil Procedure, the defendant seeks to become a third-party plaintiff by filing a third party complaint against a third party not presently party to the lawsuit, who thereby becomes a third-party defendant. This complaint alleges that the third party is liable for all or part of the damages that the original plaintiff may win from the original defendant.

The theory is that two cases may be decided together and justice may be done more efficiently than by having two suits in a series. Otherwise, more judicial time would be used in hearing the second suit.

Common bases of contingent or derivative liability by which third parties may be impleaded include indemnity, subrogation, contribution, and warranty.

For example, in a case where a driver rear-ended another car due to faulty brakes, and is sued by the accident victim, the driver may decide to implead the repair shop where the brakes were worked on because the driver's liability derives from the repair shop's liability for their faulty repair of the brakes.

== Overview ==
Impleader is available only to defendants, not plaintiffs, unlike the similar interpleader action. Plaintiffs may however implead when a defendant counterclaims, because the plaintiffs is then the counter defendant. While many kinds of civil procedures devices occur in the form of motion, an impleader action is technically its own lawsuit.

Impleader is frequently used for indemnification, such as an insurance policy or their employer. If for example a defendant is in a car accident, and their insurance policy includes an indemnification clause, they can implead their insurance company to pay out the lawsuit. An impleaded party may turn around and sue the original defendant in turn, which is called a crossclaim.

== Federal Rules of Civil Procedure ==
Impleader in the Federal Courts derives from Rule 14 ("Third Party Practice") of the Federal Rules of Civil Procedure:

Rule 14(a)(1): The nonparty must be served with the third party complaint as well as a summons. If the original defendant intends to do this more than 14 days after serving its original answer, it must first, by motion, obtain the court's leave to do so.

Rule 14(a)(2): When properly served, the third-party defendant

- must assert any defense against the thirdparty plaintiff's claim under Rule 12;
- must assert any counterclaims against the third-party plaintiff that are compulsory under Rule 13(a);
- may assert any counterclaim against the third-party plaintiff under Rule 13(b) or any crossclaim against another third-party defendant under Rule 13(g);
- may assert against the plaintiff any defense that the third-party plaintiff has to the plaintiff's claim;
- and may also assert against the plaintiff any claim arising out of the transaction or occurrence that is the subject matter of the plaintiff's claim against the third-party plaintiff.

Rule 14(a)(3): The original plaintiff may now assert claims against the third-party defendant, as long as they arise out of the transaction or occurrence that is the subject matter of his claim against the third-party plaintiff. The third-party defendant must then assert any defense under Rule 12 and any counterclaim under Rule 13(a), and may assert any counterclaim under Rule 13(b) or any cross-claim under Rule 13(g).

Rule 14(a)(4): Any party may move to strike the third-party claim, to sever it, or to try it separately.

Rule 14(a)(5): A third-party defendant may engage in third-party practice of his own.

Rule 14(a)(6): Special rules regarding maritime or admiralty jurisdiction.

Rule 14(b): When a claim is asserted against a plaintiff, he may engage in third-party practice of his own.

Rule 14(c): Special rules regarding maritime or admiralty jurisdiction.

== Other third-party claims ==
- Crossclaim
- Interpleader
- Intervention
