= Federal Interpleader Act of 1936 =

United States law

The Federal Interpleader Act of 1936 49 Stat. 1096 was United States federal legislation enacted by the 74th United States Congress approved January 20, 1936.

== History ==
The Act repealed and replaced the existing federal interpleader act 44 Stat. 416 approved May 8, 1926 and codified it as United States Judicial Code §41(26), and established the modern statutory interpleader. The act was drafted by Zechariah Chafee, who considered this his foremost professional accomplishment.

The Federal Interpleader Act was enacted to overcome the ruling of the United States Supreme Court in New York Life v. Dunlevy 241 U.S. 518, that for a party to be bound by an interpleader that party must be served process in a way that obtains personal jurisdiction by enabling nationwide service of process. The original act Federal Interpleader Act of 1917 allowed an insurance company, or fraternal benefit society subject to multiple claims on the same policy to file a suit in equity by a bill of interpleader in United States District Courts and providing nationwide service of process. The policy must have a value of at least $500 is claimed or may be claimed by adverse claimants; which is less than the amount in controversy of $3,000 in Judicial Code §48(1) then required for general diversity jurisdiction. Two or more of the beneficiaries must live in different states.

The 1917 act was amended in 1925 by 43 Stat. 973 approved February 25, 1925. This element of civil procedure was subsequently in 1926 was repealed and replaced by, 44 Stat. 416 approved May 8, 1926, which added to those who can bring suit casualty company and surety company, empowered the court to enjoin claimant from proceeding in any state or other federal court on the same liability, adding provisions as to the proper venue for the interpleader in certain cases but required that there must be actual claims by eliminating the words "may claim" that were in the 1917 act.

When the United States Judicial Code was enacted into United States Code as positive law in 1948, 62 Stat. 931 approved June 25, 1948, it was reconstituted as 28 U.S.C. § 1335, 1397, and 2361.

== The Act ==
Section one of the act codified as United States Judicial Code §41(26) the following:

- jurisdiction : United States District Courts have original jurisdiction under Judicial Code §41(26)(a) to hear suites in equity:
- began by a bill of interpleader or a Bill in the Nature of Interpleader; since it can be a brought as a bill in the nature of Interpleader the stakeholder may claim an interest in the fund.
- brought by any person, firm, corporation, association or society
- duly verified, i.e., under oath or affirmation
- amount in controversy (res): the stakeholders having custody of money, or property, issued notes, bond, certificate, insurance policy, or instrument or loan of money or property or being under any oblation written or unwritten valued at $500 or more; which is less than the amount in controversy of $3,000 in Judicial Code §48(26)(1) [28 USC 41(1) (1934)]. then required for general diversity jurisdiction
  - diversity jurisdiction: Two or more adverse claimants, citizens of different states, are claiming to be entitled to the res, Judicial Code §41(26)(a)(i)(a). This is known as minimal diversity and was held to be permissible under Article III, § 2 of the United States Constitution, Treinies v Sunshine Mine Co. 308 U.S. 66 (1939)
  - the stakeholder deposits the res with the registry of the court, there to abide the judgment of the court Judicial Code §41(26)(a)(ii)(a) or gives a bond payable to the clerk of the court in such amount and with surety as the court may deem proper, conditioned by the stakeholder's compliance with future orders or decree of the court with respect to the res Judicial Code §41(26)(a)(ii)(b)
- whether or not the claims have common origins, identical, adverse or independent of each other Judicial Code §41(26)(a)
- Venue: A District where one or more person residing within the jurisdiction of the court Judicial Code §41(26)(b)
- Nationwide service of process: The court may issue process to any claimant to the United States marshal of any district the claimant may reside or be found. Judicial Code §41(26)(c)
- the court may issue injunctions against the claimants enjoining them from instituting, or prosecuting any suit or proceeding in any state or United States District Court on account of the res until further order of the court. Judicial Code §41(26)(c)
- the court shall hear and determine the cause, discharge the stakeholder from further liability and make the injunction permanent. Judicial Code §41(26)(d)
- It allowed a bill of interpleader or a bill in the nature of interpleader to be made as an equitable defense in actions at law under Judicial Code §274b. Judicial Code §41(26)(e)

Section 2 repeals the existing Federal Interpleader Act 44 Stat. 416 28 USC 41(26) (1934).
