= Federal Interpleader Act of 1917 =

- Other short titles: Insurance Interpleader Act of 1917
- Long title: An Act Authorizing insurance companies and fraternal beneficiary societies to file bills of interpleader
- Nicknames: The First Interpleader Act
- Enacted by: the 64th United States Congress
- Effective: February 22, 1917

Citations
- Public law: Public Law 64-346
- Statutes at Large: 39 Stat. 929

Codification
- U.S.C. sections created: 28 U.S.C. § 41(26)

Legislative history
- Introduced in the House of Representatives as H.R. 12541 by J. Hampton Moore (R‑PA) on March 2, 1916; Committee consideration by House Committee on the Judiciary; Passed the House of Representatives on January 11, 1917 (Voice vote); Passed the Senate on February 14, 1917 (Voice vote); Signed into law by President Woodrow Wilson on February 22, 1917

Major amendments
- Federal Interpleader Act of 1926 (44 Stat. 416), Federal Interpleader Act of 1936 (49 Stat. 1096)

United States Supreme Court cases
- Driven by: New York Life Insurance Co. v. Dunlevy (1916)

The Federal Interpleader Act of 1917 39 Stat. 929 was United States federal legislation enacted by the 64th United States Congress approved February 22, 1917. In 1925 it was codified in the United States Code as 28 U.S.C. 41(26) (1925).

== History ==
The Act allowed an insurance company, or fraternal benefit society subject to multiple claims on the same policy to file a suit in equity by a bill of interpleader in United States district courts and providing nationwide service of process. It was introduced to overcome the ruling of the United States Supreme Court in New York Life v. Dunlevy 241 U.S. 518, that for a party to be bound by an interpleader that party must be served process in a way that obtains personal jurisdiction. The policy must have a value of at least $500 is claimed or may be claimed by adverse claimants; which is less than the amount in controversy of $3,000 in Judicial Code §48(1) then required for general diversity jurisdiction. Two or more of the beneficiaries must live in different states.

This Act was amended in 1925 by 43 Stat. 976 approved February 25, 1925 dividing it into three sections, eliminating the words "may claim" that were in the 1917 act and clarifying the venue provisions . This element of civil procedure was subsequently in 1926 was repealed and replaced by, 44 Stat. 416 approved May 8, 1926, which added to those who can bring suit casualty company and surety company, empowered the court to enjoin claimant from proceeding in any state or other federal court on the same liability, adding provisions as to the proper venue for the interpleader in cases were the claimants are in different districts. In 1936 the Federal Interpeader Act was again repealed and replaced by the Federal Interpleader Act of 1936, 49 Stat. 1096, approved Jan. 20, 1936, drafted by Zechariah Chafee which codified it in as United States Judicial Code §41(26), and established the modern statutory interpleader allowing suite to be brought by any person, firm, corporation, association or society having custody of money or property or insurance policy or instrument valued at $500 or more which there are two or more adverse claimant who are citizens of different states, whether or not the claims have common origins, identical, adverse or independent of each other, and allowed it to be an equitable defense in actions at law, Judicial Code §274b. When the United States Judicial Code was enacted into United States Code as positive law in 1948, 62 Stat. 931 approved June 25, 1948, it was reconstituted as 28 U.S.C. § 1335, 1397, and 2361.

== The Act ==
United States district courts have jurisdiction to hear suites in equity began by a bill of interpleader where:

- brought by insurance company, or fraternal beneficiary society
- duly verified
- the bill shows one or more person residing within the jurisdiction of the court is a bona fide claimant against the company or society
- the company or society made or issued an insurance policy or certificate of membership for the payment of at least $500
- to beneficiaries, heirs, next of kin, or legal representative of the insured person or member
- two or more adverse claimants, citizens of different states, are claiming or may claim entitlement to the insurance or benefits
- the company or society deposits the amount of such insurance or benefits with the clerk of the court.

The court may issue process to any claimant to the United States marshal of any district the claimant may reside or be found.
