= Interpleader =

US civil court procedural device

Interpleader is a civil procedure device that allows a plaintiff or a defendant to initiate a lawsuit in order to compel two or more other parties to litigate a dispute. An interpleader action originates when the plaintiff holds property on behalf of another, but does not know to whom the property should be transferred. It is often used to resolve disputes arising under insurance contracts, such as when a plaintiff with a personal injury claim has a dispute with medical providers over the payment out of a settlement for medical services provided to treat the plaintiff's injuries.

== Terminology and overview ==
In an interpleader action, the party initiating the litigation, normally the plaintiff, is termed the stakeholder. The money or other property in controversy is called the res (a Latin word meaning object or thing). All defendants having a possible interest in the subject matter of the case are called claimants. In some jurisdictions, the plaintiff is referred to as the plaintiff-in-interpleader and each claimant a claimant-in-interpleader.

An interpleader proceeding has two stages. The first stage determines if the stakeholder is entitled to an interpleader and if he should be discharged from liability. The second stage is like an action at law to determine which of the claimants is entitled to the res.

== Application ==
Suppose a person dies with a valid life insurance policy in effect. The insurance company is ready, willing, and able to pay the policy proceeds in specified percentages to named beneficiaries as last directed by the policyholder, but becomes aware of a dispute among them and/or third parties as to who are the proper beneficiaries or the proper distribution of proceeds among the beneficiaries. Such a dispute commonly arises from interpersonal friction among the policyholder's survivors. One specific situation commonly seen in the reported cases is where the policyholder was allegedly murdered by a beneficiary (which would disqualify that beneficiary from receiving any proceeds).

To resolve such a dispute, the insurance company can file an interpleader action. The insurance company is the stakeholder, the claimants are the persons who might be beneficiaries under the policy, and the cash value of the policy benefit is the res. Under the proceeding as originally developed, the stakeholder would deposit the res with the court, and then the defendants would have their claims adjudicated by the court. Statutory modifications to the procedure, which vary by jurisdiction, sometimes allow the stakeholder to retain the res pending final disposition of the case. Typically, once the stakeholder deposits the res into the court (for example, the face value of the insurance policy), the stakeholder is released from the action and the claimants proceed against each other to determine which of them is legally entitled to the res. A disinterested stakeholder is entitled to costs including attorney's fees. Except for the denominations of the parties, the action proceeds for the most part as other civil lawsuits in the same jurisdiction.

In some jurisdictions, the res will earn interest at the legal rate until disbursed. The successful claimant is entitled to the interest as well as the principal.

== History ==
=== Origins in common law and equity ===
Interpleader had its origins as a civil procedure at common law, which was later adopted and expanded by the Court of Chancery in its equitable jurisprudence. The common law procedure became obsolete over time and fell into disuse, but it remained active in the courts of equity.

It originally applied to bailees subject to multiple actions of detinue, and privity was required either between the parties or in detinue, in order for the defendant to be able to sue for garnishment.

In contrast, the equitable bill of interpleader required that:

1. The same thing, debt, or duty must be the res claimed by all the claimants;
2. All the adverse titles or claims must be dependent or derived from a common source;
3. The stakeholder must not have or claim any interest it the res,
4. The stakeholder must have incurred no independent liability to any claimant, i.e. he must be perfectly indifferent between them.

=== Subsequent development in England and Wales ===
In 1831 Parliament passed the Interpleader Act 1831, which authorized a bill of interpleader to be brought in the common law courts (such as the Court of Common Pleas) by:

- sheriffs who have executed on goods or chattels that a third party makes a claim to, and defendants in actions of assumpsit, debt, detinue or trover, who:

- do not claim any interest in the subject of the subject matter of the suit, but the right to them is claimed or supposed to belong to a third party who has sued or expect to sue for the subject matter of the suit;
- has not colluded in any matter with such third party
- is ready to bring into court or pay or depose of the subject matter of the action in such manner as the court directs.

Statutory interpleader was extended by Common Law Procedure Act 1860, which allowed a defendant to interplead claimants even if the title of the claimants to the res have no common origin, but are adverse to and independent of one another.

The statutory rules governing interpleader proceedings were replaced by rules of court that came into force upon the passage of the Supreme Court of Judicature Act 1873 (as amended by the Supreme Court of Judicature Act 1875), which came to be known as Order 17 of the Rules of the Supreme Court. A similar provision was enacted in the County Court Rules, known as Order 33 in the Rules of 1981.

Circumstances where interpleader proceedings could be brought (1873-2014)
In the High Court (Order 17)	In the County Court (Order 33)
a person is under a liability in respect of a debt or in respect of any money, goods or chattels and he is, or expects to be, sued for or in respect of that debt or money or those goods or chattels by two or more persons making adverse claims thereto; or; a sheriff or a person expected to be sued by two or more persons as claims made to any money, goods, or chattels taken or intended to be taken by a sheriff in execution under any process, or to the proceeds or value of any such goods or chattels, by a person other than the person against whom the process is issued,	a person is making a claim to or in respect of goods seized in execution of the County Court or the proceeds or value thereof; a person is under a liability in respect of a debt or any money or goods and he is, or expects to be, sued for or in respect of the debt, money or goods by two or more persons making adverse claims thereto.

In cases where a person was subject to multiple claims, the applicant had to show that he:

- claimed no interest in the subject-matter in dispute other than for charges or costs;
- did not collude with any of the claimants to that subject-matter; and
- was willing to pay or transfer that subject-matter into court or to dispose of it as the court may direct.

As a result of the coming into force of Part 3 and Schedule 12 of the Tribunals, Courts and Enforcement Act 2007 on 6 April 2014, Order 17 and Order 33 were replaced by the new Parts 83-86 of the Civil Procedure Rules. This replaced the interpleader proceedings previously governed by the court rules by the procedure of "enforcement by taking control of goods" under newly passed regulations. In addition, s. 65 of the 2007 Act declared:

(1)This Chapter replaces the common law rules about the exercise of the powers which under it become powers to use the procedure in Schedule 12.

(2)The rules replaced include—

(a) rules distinguishing between an illegal, an irregular and an excessive exercise of a power;
(b) rules that would entitle a person to bring proceedings of a kind for which paragraph 66 of Schedule 12 provides (remedies available to the debtor);
(c) rules of replevin;
(d) rules about rescuing goods.

Procedures are in effect for claims where:

(a) a person makes an application to the court claiming that goods of which control has been taken belong to that person and not to the debtor;
(b) a person makes an application to the court claiming that goods, money or chattels taken or intended to be taken under a writ of execution or the proceeds or value of such goods or chattels belong to that person and not to the debtor; and
(c) a debtor, whose goods have been made subject to an enforcement power under an enactment, writ or warrant of control or have been taken or are intended to be taken under a writ of execution, claims that such goods or any of them are exempt goods.

The 2014 amendments have proved to be problematic, in that they now fail to cover a situation where:

- a third party has given notice that they believe they are entitled to the goods under Rule 85.4(1),
- a counter-notice is duly given by the creditor under Rule 85.4(3), but
- the third party then fails to commence the application to the court which is required under Rule 85.5, and
- the provisions of Rule 85.5 impose no time limit by which the application under that Rule must be made by the creditor or other party claiming an interest.

In February 2018, several High Court enforcement officers asked the Queen's Bench Division for directions as to how to proceed in such circumstances, and the Master ruled that the repeal of Rule 17 had the effect of reviving the equitable form of interpleader proceedings, as the 2007 Act did not expressly abolish the interpleader action itself, and "interpleader statutes are not at all to limit or affect the equitable jurisdiction of the court to entertain an interpleader suit or action."

=== In the United States ===
Formerly a plaintiff had to disavow any claim to the res in order to avail himself of the interpleader remedy, but this requirement has also been relaxed or abolished in most jurisdictions by there being a Bill in the Nature of Interpleader rather than a strict bill of interpleader. A plaintiff may now argue that neither of the claimants has a right to the property at issue. For example, a person dies with a life insurance policy that excludes coverage for suicide. Two people come forward claiming to be the beneficiary named in the policy. The insurance company believes that the deceased committed suicide, but the claimants believe the death was by accident. The insurance company could interplead the two claimants and simultaneously deny the claims.

The Supreme Court of the United States ruled in New York Life v. Dunlevy 241 U.S. 518, that for a claimant to be bound by an interpleader that party must be served process in a way that obtains personal jurisdiction. In 1922 the United States Supreme Court in Liberty Oil Co. v. Condon Nat. Bank 260 U.S. 235 sustained that a defensive interpeader in an action at law in federal court could be taken under Judicial Code section 274b added by 38 Stat. 956 that authorized the interposing of equitable defenses in actions at law.

The Federal Interpleader Act of 1917 39 Stat. 929 was enacted by the 64th United States Congress approved February 22, 1917 to overcome the problem with an interpleader when the claimants live in different states raised in New York Life v. Dunlevy. The Federal Interpleader Act of 1917 allowed an insurance company, or fraternal benefit society subject to multiple claims on the same policy to file a suit in equity by a bill of interpleader in United States district courts and providing nationwide service of process. The policy must have a value of at least $500 claimed were claimed or may be claimed by adverse claimants; which is less than the amount in controversy of $3,000 in Judicial Code §48(1) then required for general diversity jurisdiction and two or more of the beneficiaries must live in different states. In 1926 it was repealed and replaced by, 44 Stat. 416 approved May 8, 1926, which added to those who can bring suit casualty company and surety company, empowered the court to enjoin claimant from proceeding in any state or other federal court on the same liability, adding provisions as to the proper venue for the interpleader in certain cases but required that there must be actual claims by eliminating the words "may claim" that were in the 1917 act. In 1936 the Federal Interpeader Act was again repealed and replaced by the Federal Interpleader Act of 1936, 49 Stat. 1096, approved Jan. 20, 1936, drafted by Zechariah Chafee which codified it in as United States Judicial Code §41(26), and established the modern statutory interpleader allowing suit to be brought by any person, firm, corporation, association or society having custody of money or property or insurance policy or instrument valued at $500 or more which there are two or more adverse claimant who are citizens of different states, whether or not the claims have common origins, identical, adverse or independent of each other, and allowed it to be an equitable defense in actions at law, Judicial Code §274b. When the United States Judicial Code was enacted into United States Code as positive law in 1948, 62 Stat. 931 approved June 25, 1948, it was reconstituted as 28 U.S.C. § 1335, 1397, and 2361.

Federal courts have held that because of the deposit of the res with the court an interpleader action is an action to determine the validity of competing claims to identified property that served may be under 28 U.S.C. § 1655 which authorize other forms of service to obtain in rem jurisdiction over absent defendants.

== Different types of interpleader in U.S. federal practice ==
There are two specific types of interpleader actions in the United States federal courts. Statutory Interpleader governed by 28 U.S.C. § 1335, and Rule Interpleader established by Federal Rules of Civil Procedure 22.

=== Statutory interpleader ===
- 28 U.S.C. § 1335 allows an individual with a stake which is, or may be, claimed by two or more adverse claimants, to interplead those claimants and bring them into a singular action.
- Jurisdiction: Under 28 U.S.C. § 2361, a person anywhere within the United States may be served by the stakeholder
- Diversity: Diversity jurisdiction is satisfied as long as there are two claimants of different states 28 U.S.C. § 1335(a)(1). For example, if you have three claimants, two of which are residents of Florida, and one from California, diversity would be satisfied. The diversity of the stakeholder, however, is irrelevant to the rule. This is known as minimal diversity and was held to be permissible under Article III, § 2 of the United States Constitution, State Farm Fire and Cas. Co. v. Tashire 386 U.S. 523, 530 (1967)
- Amount in controversy: The stake in the claim (amount in controversy) must be greater than or equal to $500 in value 28 U.S.C. § 1335(a), opposed to the Rule Interpleader requirement of any amount exceeding $75,000 in diversity based actions 28 U.S.C. § 1332(b).
- Venue: The venue for a Statutory Interpleader is in the Judicial District in which one of the claimants resides, 28 U.S.C. § 1397.
- Deposit: A Statutory Interpleader action is commenced by the stakeholder who must initially deposit with the court, the amount in controversy, or post a specific bond with the court, 28 U.S.C. § 1335(a)(2). The stakeholder may, however, at trial claim they don't owe money to the claimants at all, since the action can be in the nature of interpleader.

Such an action may be entertained although the titles or claims of the conflicting claimants do not have a common origin, or are not identical, but are adverse to and independent of one another. 28 U.S.C. § 1335(b).

- Injunction: Once the statutory interpleader action is commenced, the court may restrict all claimants from starting or continuing any action which would affect the stake, make such injunction permanent, and discharge the stakeholder from liability. 28 U.S.C. § 2361. Such injunction is not governed by Federal Rule of Civil Procedure Rule 65.

The may claim language added in 1948 codification to Title 28 of the United States Code in the definitions of claim allow interpleader for unliquidated claims, such as multiple claimant to a liability insurance policy injured in an accident before they are reduced to judgment or settled, however the injunction may only restrain the claimants from suits making claims against the res not suits to liquidate the claim or against third parties. The procedures for a Statutory Interpleader action are governed by the Federal Rules of Civil Procedure. Rule 22(b).

=== Rule interpleader ===
(Current as of December 1, 2011)

Interpleader is also allowed by the Federal Rules of Civil Procedure 22. Rule 22 is known as rule interpleader. Rule interpleader provides a remedy for any person who is, or may be exposed to double or multiple liabilities. The stakeholder may invoke Rule 22 as a plaintiff, or by counter-claiming in an action already started against him by one, or more claimants. There are specific differences between Statutory Interpleader, and Rule Interpleader:

- Jurisdiction: Rule Interpleader does not provide a basis for jurisdiction in the United States District Court; there must be an independent basis of jurisdiction under Title 28 of the United States Code, i.e., diversity jurisdiction 28 U.S.C. § 1332(a) which requires that the claimants have complete diversity between the stakeholder, and all claimants; but not between the claimants, or federal question jurisdiction 28 U.S.C. § 1331 i.e., when a claim is based on federal law; or there is a specific statute authorizing interpleader i.e., 38 U.S.C. § 1984 or 49 U.S.C. § 80110(e).
- Service: There is no nationwide service of process as in a statutory interpleader action. Service must be carried out within the state where the court sits, or according to the long-arm statute of the state, Rule 4(k)(1).
- Amount in Controversy: The amount in controversy must exceed $75,000 if based on diversity jurisdiction meeting the requirements of 28 U.S.C. § 1332(b).
- Deposit: There is no deposit required to be made with the court for a Rule 22 interpleader action. The stakeholder may claim that they are not liable in whole, or part, to any or all the claimants, Rule 22(a)(1)(B). However for the stakeholder to be discharged he must deposit the money or property with the court pursuant to Rule 67.

==== Bankruptcy ====
In bankruptcy court interpleader under Federal Rules of Civil Procedure 22 may be maintained as an adversary proceeding under Federal Rules of Bankruptcy Procedure 7022.

==== Federal Rules of Civil Procedure 22 ====
(a) Grounds for an Interpleader Action

(1) By a Plaintiff. Persons with claims that may expose a plaintiff to double or multiple liability may be joined as defendants and required to interplead. Joinder for interpleader is proper even though:

(A) the claims of the several claimants, or the titles on which their claims depend, lack a common origin or are adverse and independent rather than identical; or
(B) the plaintiff denies liability in whole or in part to any or all of the claimants.

(2) By a Defendant. A defendant exposed to similar liability may seek interpleader through a crossclaim or counterclaim.

(b) Relation to Other Rules and Statutes.

This rule supplements – and does not limit – the joinder of parties allowed by Rule 20. The remedy this rule provides is in addition to – and does not supersede or limit – the remedy provided by 28 U.S.C. § 1335, 1397, and 2361. An action under those statutes must be conducted under these rules.

== Interpleader in U.S. State practice ==
The Uniform Commercial Code §7-603, adopted in all 50 of the states of the United States, provides that a bailee may bring an interpleader as an original action or as a defense to a suit for nondelivery when more than one person claims title to or possession of the goods under document of title (warehouse receipt or bill of lading).

In Louisiana interpleader is called "concursus". In most states there are statutes or court rules that provide for interpleader similar to the federal rules.

== See also ==
- Multiplepoinding, a similar form of action in Scots law

== Sources ==
- Maclennan, Roderick James (1901). The Law of Interpleader as administered by the English, Irish, American, Canadian and Australian Courts. Toronto: Carswell. ISBN 978-0-665-73060-3.
