= Simon Fieldhouse =

Australian artist

Simon Fieldhouse (born 25 March 1956) is an artist based in Sydney, Australia. He was educated at Newington College (1963), Barker College, Geelong Grammar School and The University of Sydney where he obtained a Bachelor of Arts.

He studied law and practiced briefly as a solicitor, ceasing in 1988.

He was illustrator of Portraits on Yellow Paper with text by former Supreme Court of New South Wales judge Roddy Meagher. This was Meagher's satirical descriptions of friends and colleagues, including Edmund Capon, Ross Edwards, John Howard, Margaret Olley and Laurence Street. In his review, Michael Kirby praised in particular Fieldhouse's portraits of Patricia Bergin of the Supreme Court of New South Wales, Dame Leonie Kramer and Cardinal George Pell, while Christopher Pearson singled out those of Penny Meagher and John Lehane.

Fieldhouse's works have been exhibited widely and his paintings used to illustrate the National Trust desk diaries "Historic Architecture of Australia" in 2002 and "Historic Architecture of Australia II" in 2004. The Chancellor's Committee of The University of Sydney produced a collection of greeting and gift cards using some of his University paintings in 2002.

He has produced many paintings depicting historic Australian architecture with whimsical characters, including one of Parliament House, Canberra which shows five skydivers.

In 2006, he was commissioned by the Faculty of Medicine at the University of Sydney to produce 35 portraits of its professors of medicine. This series follows that of Sir Lionel Lindsay, who produced professors' portraits in 1916.

Fieldhouse also has completed a series of paintings of historic architecture of New York City.

In 2020–2021 he created artworks showing the COVID-19 response of the Sydney local health district. In 2022, his portrait of Tony Abbott, which had been commissioned by St John's College, University of Sydney where Abbott had studied, was unveiled.
