= Equity (law) =

Set of legal principles supplementing but distinct from the Common Law

In law, particularly in common law jurisdictions, equity is the body of law that historically developed in the English Court of Chancery, which created a set of equitable doctrines distinct from the rest of English common law.

The equitable jurisdiction of a court of equity spanned much of English private law, particularly the law of property, contract, tort, and restitution, resulting in the development of equitable principles (e.g. good faith), interests (e.g. those under trust), remedies (e.g. injunctions), and maxims, that continue to this day.

Beginning in the Medieval ages, equitable rules were historically developed largely in cases before the courts of equity, which provided relief where the inflexible legal rules of the Court of Common Pleas and King's Bench were thought to be inequitable or unconscionable. In the late 19th-century, the Judicature Acts abolished the split system of courts in England, whilst retaining the laws of equity within English common law as a distinct but complementary set of rules.

The tradition of equity as a flexible system of adjudication can be traced to the writings of Aristotle (epieikeia) and Roman law (aequitas). Later, in some civil law systems, equity was integrated in the legal rules, but in common law systems it became an independent body of law. Today, equitable legal rules exists in both civil law and common law systems as well as in international law.

== Terminology ==
The use of the terms "equity" and "common law" in legal discourse refers to a number of different concepts.

=== Political and philosophical concept ===
Equity, in a general sense, is often used to describe notions of fairness, justice, and equality. In his Nicomachean Ethics, Aristotle introduced the concept of epieikeia (equity), describing it as a necessary correction to the law when the law's "universality" makes its application unjust in a specific case. Courts often use "equity" in this sense and not specifically in relation to the law of equity.

==== In civilian jurisdictions ====
In ancient Roman law, magistrates, in particular the Praetors, would sometimes reference the concept of aequitas in performing their adjudicative and legislative functions. Over time, a body of law (ius honorarium) created by the Praetors emerged that supplemented the relatively inflexible civil law (ius civile). The development of this body of discretionary and relatively flexible rules, however, slowed over time, and by the time of Hadrian, had essentially been codified into a set of fixed ruled amendable only by the emperor.

In modern civil law jurisdictions, the concept of a split system of 'equitable' and 'legal' rules is not widely found or applied.

==== In common-law jurisdictions ====
Common law jurisdictions are those that trace its historical origins to medieval English law. Unlike many of the civilian jurisdictions in continental Europe, English law did not originate in the Roman law ius civile codes. Rather, much of English law was and is a result of the decisions of judges, and this judge-made law is described as the "common law" as it was common to all the English courts.

=== In common-law jurisdictions ===
Medieval Lord Chancellors, drawing upon the ancient distinction between the ius honorarium and ius civile in Roman law, began to assert a similar jurisdiction over legal matters where it was believed that the common law courts were too inflexible or could otherwise not deliver a just result. Over time, a separate body of rules began to emerge from the Lord Chancellor's Court of Chancery, which came to be known as rules of "equity".

The use of "equity" in relation to "common law" refers to the distinction between rules that originated in the "common law" (or just "law") from those in "equity". Modern equity includes areas of law such as injunctive relief, trusts, fiduciary law, estoppel, relief against penalties and forfeiture, the doctrines of contribution, subrogation and marshalling, and the set-off.

==== As equitable interests ====
The term "equity" may also be used to refer to an equitable interest. The High Court of Australia in Latec Investments Ltd v Hotel Terrigal Pty Ltd identified three kinds of equities: equitable interests, mere equities and personal equities. A mere equity, for example, may arise when one party has been unjustly disadvantaged by the unconscionable behaviour of another. Importantly, however, a 'mere equity' will not prevail over an actual bona fide equitable interest – such as an equitable charge. In English law, 'mere equities' are codified in statute.

== History ==
After the Norman Conquest of England in the 11th century, royal justice came to be administered in three central courts: the Court of King's Bench, the Court of Common Pleas, and the Exchequer. The common law developed in these royal courts, which were created by the authority of the King of England, and whose jurisdiction over disputes between the King's subjects was based upon the King's writ. Initially, a writ was probably a vague order to do right by the plaintiff, and it was usually a writ of grace, issued at the pleasure of the King.

During the 12th and 13th centuries, writ procedure gradually became much more rigid. All writs to commence actions had to be purchased by litigants from the Chancery, the head of which was the Lord Chancellor. In 1258, Parliament provided in the Provisions of Oxford that the Chancellor could no longer create new writs without permission from the King and the King's Council (the curia regis). Pursuant to this authorization, litigants could purchase certain enumerated writs de cursu (as a matter of course) which later became known as writs ex debito justitiae (as a matter of right).

Each of these writs was associated with particular circumstances and led to a particular kind of judgment. Procedure in the common law courts became tightly focused on the form of action (the particular procedure authorized by a particular writ to enforce a particular substantive right), rather than the cause of action (the underlying substantive right to be enforced). Because the writ system was limited to enumerated writs for enumerated rights and wrongs, it sometimes produced unjust results because of its rigidity. Lacking a legal remedy, the plaintiff's only option would be to petition the King. Such petitions were initially processed by the King's Council, which itself was quite overworked, and the Council began to delegate the hearing of such petitions to the Lord Chancellor. This delegation is often morally justified by the fact that the Lord Chancellor was literally the Keeper of the King's Conscience, although Francis Palgrave argued that the delegation was initially driven by practical concerns and the moral justification came later.

=== Court of Chancery (c. 1350–1875) ===
By the 14th century, it appears that the Chancery was operating as a court, affording remedies for cases in which the strict procedures of the common law worked injustice or provided no remedy to a deserving plaintiff. Chancellors often had theological and clerical training and were well versed in Roman law and canon law. During this era, the Roman concept of aequitas influenced the development of the distinctly different but related English concept of equity: "The equity administered by the early English chancellors ... [was] confessedly borrowed from the aequitas and the judicial powers of the Roman magistrates." By the 15th century, the judicial power of Chancery was clearly recognised.

Early Chancery pleadings vaguely invoked some sort of higher justice, such as with the formula "for the love of God and in way of charity". During the 15th century, Chancery pleadings began to expressly invoke "conscience", to the point that English lawyers in the late 15th century thought of Chancery as a court of "conscience", not a court of "equity". However, the "reasoning of the medieval chancellors has not been preserved" as to what they actually meant by the word "conscience", and modern scholars can only indirectly guess at what the word probably meant. The publication of the treatise The Doctor and Student in the early 16th century marked the beginning of Chancery's transformation from a court of conscience to a court of equity.

Before that point in time, the word "equity" was used in the common law to refer to a principle of statutory interpretation derived from aequitas: the idea that written laws ought to be interpreted "according to the intention rather than the letter" of the law. What was new was the application of the word "equity" to "the extraordinary form of justice administered by the chancellor", as a convenient way to distinguish Chancery jurisprudence from the common law.

The early chancellors were influenced by their training in theology and canon law, but the law of equity they applied was not canon law, but a new kind of law purportedly driven by conscience. Complaints about equity as an arbitrary exercise of conscience by nonlawyer Chancellors became quite frequent under the chancellorship of Thomas Wolsey (1515–1529), who "had no legal training, and delighted in putting down lawyers". A common criticism of Chancery practice as it developed in the early medieval period was that thus it lacked fixed rules, varied greatly from Chancellor to Chancellor, and the Chancellor was exercising an unbounded discretion. The counterargument was that equity mitigated the rigour of the common law by looking to substance rather than to form. The most famous criticism of equity was written by 17th-century jurist John Selden, who compared equity to "a Chancellor's foot" because of how "an uncertain measure... a Chancellor's conscience" was.

In an 1818 chancery case, Lord Eldon's wrote, in response to Selden : "I cannot agree that the doctrines of this court are to be changed with every succeeding judge. Nothing would inflict on me greater pain, in quitting this place, than the recollection that I had done anything to justify the reproach that the equity of this court varies like the Chancellor's foot." Indeed, as early as 1660, Chancery cases were regularly reported, several equitable doctrines developed, and equity started to evolve into a system of precedents like its common law cousin. Over time, equity jurisprudence would gradually become a "body of equitable law, as complex, doctrinal, and rule-haunted as the common law ever was".

==== Relationship with common law ====
In 1546, Chancellor Thomas Wriothesley, a nonlawyer, was accused of trying to inject civil law into Chancery. This was a "wild exaggeration", but as a result, the Crown began to transition away from clergy and nonlawyers and instead appointed only lawyers trained in the common law tradition to the position of Lord Chancellor (although there were six more nonlawyer chancellors in the decades after Wriothesley). The last person without training in the common law to serve as Lord Chancellor before the role was stripped of its judicial powers by the Constitutional Reform Act 2005 was Anthony Ashley Cooper, 1st Earl of Shaftesbury, who served briefly from 1672 to 1673.

The development of a court of equity as a remedy for the rigid procedure of the common law courts meant it was inevitable that the two systems would come into conflict. Litigants would go "jurisdiction shopping" and often would seek an equitable injunction prohibiting the enforcement of a common law court order. The penalty for disobeying an equitable injunction and enforcing an unconscionable common law judgment was imprisonment.

The 1615 conflict between common law and equity came about because of a "clash of strong personalities" between Lord Chancellor Ellesmere and the Chief Justice of the King's Bench, Sir Edward Coke. Chief Justice Coke began the practice of issuing writs of habeas corpus that required the release of people imprisoned for contempt of chancery orders. This tension reached a climax in the Earl of Oxford's case (1615), which led to a ruling by Sir Francis, by authority of King James I, that in the event of any conflict between the common law and equity, equity would prevail.

=== Judicature Acts (c. 1870) ===
The Judicature Acts of the 1870s effected a procedural fusion of the two bodies of law, thereby ending their institutional separation. The reforms did not fuse the actual bodies of law, however. This lack of fusion meant it was still not possible to receive an equitable remedy for a purely common law wrong. Judicial or academic reasoning which assumes the contrary has been described as a "fusion fallacy". Further, the Judicature Acts enshrined equity's primacy over the common law.

=== British commonwealth and colonies ===
The split system of courts and legal systems propagated to many British colonies, including the United States. Equity courts were widely distrusted in the northeastern United States following the American Revolution. A serious movement for merger of law and equity began in the states in the mid-19th century, when David Dudley Field II convinced New York State to adopt what became known as the Field Code of 1848. The federal courts did not abandon the old law/equity separation until the promulgation of the Federal Rules of Civil Procedure in 1938. The states of Delaware, Mississippi, South Carolina, and Tennessee continue to have separate courts of equity. In New Jersey, the appellate courts are unified, but the trial courts are organized into a Chancery Division and a Law Division.

There is a difference of opinion in Commonwealth countries as to whether equity and common law have been fused or are merely administered by the same court. In Australia, the orthodox view is that the two systems of law have not been fused, with Australian courts rejecting the so-called "fusion fallacy", while support for fusion has been expressed by the New Zealand Court of Appeal.

The courts of Scotland have never recognised a division between the normal common law and equity, and as such the Court of Session (the supreme civil court of Scotland) has exercised an equitable and inherent jurisdiction known as the nobile officium. The nobile officium enables the Court to provide a legal remedy where statute or the common law are silent, and to prevent mistakes in procedure or practice that would lead to injustice. The exercise of this power is limited by adherence to precedent, and when legislation or the common law already specify the relevant remedy. Thus, the Court cannot set aside a statutory power, but can deal with situations where the law is silent, or where there is an omission in statute. Such an omission is sometimes termed a casus improvisus.

== Theory and philosophy ==
As Aristotle highlighted, equitable conduct can be said to be just as it promotes the improvement of the deficiencies of the universal concept. He concludes that equity's role within the courts "is to prevent the law from adhering too rigidly to its own rules and principles when those rules and principles produce injustice". Given that equitable principles are not absolute in nature, it is acceptable for the courts to depart from any rules when they conflict with justice. Unlike legal justice, equitable justice develops on an individualised and case-by-case basis within the courts for the purpose of enhancing just outcomes and to adequately judge the requirements of specific circumstances.

=== Limits ===
Historically, a principal justification for the intervention of equity was the Latin legal maxim, ubi jus ibi remedium ("where there is a right there must be a remedy"). Thomas Jefferson explained in 1785 that there are three main limitations on the power of a court of equity: "If the legislature means to enact an injustice, however palpable, the court of Chancery is not the body with whom a correcting power is lodged. That it shall not interpose in any case which does not come within a general description and admit of redress by a general and practicable rule."

The US Supreme Court, however, has concluded that courts have wide discretion to fashion relief in cases of equity. The first major statement of this power came in Willard v. Tayloe, 75 U.S. 557 (1869). The Court concluded that "relief is not a matter of absolute right to either party; it is a matter resting in the discretion of the court, to be exercised upon a consideration of all the circumstances of each particular case." Willard v. Tayloe was for many years the leading case in United States contract law and the law of equity.

Limits on the power of equity in English law were clarified by the House of Lords in The Scaptrade case (Scandinavian Trading Tanker Co. A.B. v Flota Petrolera Ecuatoriana [1983] 2 AC 694, 700), where the notion that the court's jurisdiction to grant relief was "unlimited and unfettered" (per Lord Simon of Glaisdale in Shiloh Spinners Ltd v. Harding [1973] A.C. 691, 726) was rejected as a "beguiling heresy". In a subsequent Privy Council ruling on Union Eagle Ltd v Golden Achievement Ltd (1997), Lord Hoffman gave an account of "why it continues to beguile and why it is a heresy".

=== Unjust enrichment ===
The law of unjust enrichment and restitution is often justified on the equitable maxim that one should not profit from their wrong. Historically in common law systems, however, the doctrine of unjust enrichment and restitution emerged from the common-law courts as arising from theories of contract and quasi-contract.

Equity remains a distinct part of the law of England and Wales and many Commonwealth jurisdictions. The main challenge to equity has come from academic writers working within the law of unjust enrichment. Debates over the utility of treating equity as a separate body of law have been labelled the "fusion wars". A particular flashpoint in this debate centres on the concept of unjust enrichment and whether areas of law traditionally regarded as equitable could be rationalised as part of a single body of law known as the law of unjust enrichment. Scholars such as Peter Birks and Andrew Burrows argue that in many cases the inclusion of the label "legal" or "equitable" before a substantive rule is often unnecessary.

Equity remains a cornerstone of Australian private law. A string of cases in the 1980s saw the High Court of Australia re-affirm the continuing vitality of traditional equitable doctrines. In 2009 the High Court affirmed the importance of equity and dismissed the suggestion that unjust enrichment has explanatory power in relation to traditional equitable doctrines such as subrogation.

=== Nature of equitable interests ===
Equitable interests are legal interests that arise from the holding of equitable title and which are protected by equitable remedies. Historically, a maxim of equity had been that equity acts in personam rather than in rem. However, this view has been challenged.

Professors Ben McFarlane and Robert Stevens of the University of Oxford distinguish equitable interests from common-law interests on three grounds: Equitable interests are rights (e.g. of A) against other rights (e.g. of B) rather than against things or people; they are prima facie binding on anyone who acquires a right that derives from A (i.e., the right which an equitable interest conveys a right against); and A "will acquire such a persistent right whenever B is under a duty to hold a specific claim-right or power, in a particular way" for A.

=== Economics and finance ===
Although trusts are often associated with intrafamily wealth transfers, they have become very important in American capital markets, particularly through pension funds (in certain countries essentially always trusts) and mutual funds (often trusts). United States tax law allows for trusts to be used for tax avoidance in certain situations.

== Trusts ==
The equitable trust is widely considered to be the most innovative contribution of the English legal system.

The modern trust is defined as a legal relationship in which the owner of property or any transferable right (the settlor), gives it to another (the trustee) to manage and use solely for the benefit of a designated person (the beneficiary). Trusts may be created by the expressed intentions of the settlor (express trusts) or by operation of law (implied trusts). Historically, courts have found there to be implied trusts in certain types of factual situations. Implied trusts are divided into two categories: resulting and constructive. A resulting trust is implied by the law to work out the presumed intentions of the parties, but it does not take into consideration their expressed intent. A constructive trust is a trust implied by law to work out justice between the parties, regardless of their intentions.

=== Historical ===
Originally, the decisions of the Lord Chancellor were seen as merely addressing particular cases and could neither affect parties not named in the decrees the Chancellor gave nor change the law. These decrees 'enjoined' the parties to act in a particular way, giving rise to the distinctive equitable remedy of the injunction. The initially limited jurisdiction of the Lord Chancellor meant that the courts of equity operated in personam, while the common law courts acted in rem. It was also thought that whereas rulings in the King's or Common Bench were binding on the rights of a party, equitable decrees only bound the person to obedience, although the Lord Chancellor could punish the person until they obeyed.

However, there were many exceptions to these principles, and over time the Lord Chancellor began to assert jurisdiction over a broad variety of cases previously thought to be in the exclusive jurisdiction of the common-law courts, including criminal matters. Criminal equity formerly existed in the Star Chamber but ceased to exist when that court was abolished.

Given that equity did not, historically, pertain to definitive or formal rules, courts were required to decide upon issues of conduct in exercising their flexible and discretionary powers. As such, the law of equity has developed specific doctrines pertaining to good faith, immorality, honesty and integrity. The latitude of the Chancellor's discretion also allowed the courts to consider the interests of the public at large when providing or refusing relief to the plaintiff.

==== Uses and trusts ====
One area in which the Court of Chancery assumed a vital role was the enforcement of uses, a predecessor to the trust, a role that the rigid framework of land law could not accommodate. This role gave rise to the basic distinction between legal and equitable interests.

According to common law, there was only one person who could be said to have a right to a piece of land, which was the person entitled to seisin. However, the Lord Chancellor created the rule that, when a person had a right to land ad opus alterius (for the benefit of another), he was bound by way of use to hold the land in good conscience. At first, uses were intended to be temporary and for conveyancing purposes. For example, uses were employed in the feudal system where a tenant by copyhold wanted to convey his land to a third party; the tenant would in such case surrender his land to the feudal lord, who held the land to the 'use' of the third party until he could be admitted as a feudal tenant. This holding of land for the benefit of another was also helpful when conveying land to those who could not otherwise own it, such as Franciscan friars or the landowners' wives.

The common law courts did not recognise the use, and it was as such later used to put land outside the reach of creditors, avoid taxes, and circumvent rules of succession. In the 15th century, the use dominated the chancery court, which at the time developed the progenitors to modern doctrines, such as equity's darling and the resulting trust.

In 1536, the Statute of Uses was enacted, abolishing the power to bequeath land by will, such that land could only be inherited by heirs in law. At the same time, the statute mandated that where a person held land for the use of another person (cestui que use), the beneficiary was regarded as if they held the land directly. The statute was very successful in restoring the Crown's feudal revenues and its draftsmanship was later much admired. It was profoundly unpopular, however. In 1540, the Statute of Wills was enacted, giving landowners the explicit right to make common law wills over a maximum of two thirds of their land, allowing them to let their heirs-at-law inherit one third.

Before the Statute of Uses, conveyancing required a formal ceremony to deliver ownership to the transferee of land. The Chancery had long implied a use where a vendor contracted to sell land to a purchaser, so that the former held the land to the use of the latter until conveyance could be done. This was analogous to the modern constructive trust. The 1536 statute meant, however, that these uses were executed immediately upon the contract of sale being agreed, passing title without requiring formal conveyance. Shortly after the 1536 statute was passed, an emergency piece of legislation, the Statute of Enrolments, was enacted, providing that where a use was created by a bargain, it was not to be executed unless it was made by deed and until it was enrolled at a common-law court.

The enactment of the Statute of Uses restricted the ability of uses to be executed, marking the beginning of the trust. Some uses had active duties the feoffee (the historical equivalent of a trustee) had to fulfill, such as managing an estate or collecting and distributing income, or paying debts. Many active uses were restricted by the 1536 statute. However, charitable uses were able to continue undisturbed, eventually becoming the modern charitable trust. The restriction that the 1536 statute imposed on uses of land by way of holding the beneficiary the owner of the land was eventually circumvented by the 'use upon the use'. These double Uses became commonplace in the first few decades after the Statue of Wills. By the 18th century, it had become common form to convey thus:

to X and his heirs unto and to the use of Y and his heirs, in trust nevertheless of Z.

This type of conveyance to create a trust would indeed be the most usual way until 1926, when the Statute of Uses was finally abolished by the Law of Property Act 1925. The change of nomenclature from "use" to "trust" was not immediate and is not clear cut; contemporary scholars like Neil Jones generally draw a line between uses created before the Statute of Uses and those created after, calling the latter "trusts".

=== In English law ===
==== Express trusts ====
In English trust law, the creation of private express trust requires three elements to be certain, which together are known as the "three certainties". These elements were determined in Knight v Knight to be intention, subject matter and objects. The certainty of intention allows the court to ascertain a settlor's true reason for creating the trust. The certainties of subject matter and objects allow the court to administer trust when the trustees fail to do so. The court determines whether there is sufficient certainty by construing the words used in the trust instrument. These words are construed objectively in their "reasonable meaning", within the context of the entire instrument. Despite intention being integral to express trusts, the court will try not to let trusts fail for the lack of certainty.

==== Resulting trusts ====
A resulting trust is an implied trust that comes into existence by operation of law, where property is transferred to a volunteer (i.e. someone who does not give consideration) and then is implied to hold the property for the benefit of another person. The trust property is said to "result" or revert to the transferor (as an implied settlor). This use of "result" means spring back. Although the volunteer may be the legal owner of the property, they are not permitted to benefit from it, with beneficial ownership being retained by the transferor. Where the transferor has died, the beneficial interest results to their estate.

In English law, there are two kinds of resulting trusts: presumptive and automatic. Presumptive resulting trusts result property transferred to a volunteer (i.e. a person who receives something without giving consideration) where there is no evidence that the property was intended to be a gift. In such instances, the rebuttable presumption in favour of the transferor is that the property was not intended to be a gift. Automatic resulting trusts arise where the trust has failed, for example, where the beneficiaries are not defined or where the objectives become impossible to achieve.

==== Constructive trusts ====
Constructive trusts are an equitable remedy imposed by a court to benefit a party who has been wrongfully deprived of their rights, due to either a person obtaining or holding a legal property right which they should not possess. They are not subject to formality requirements. Unlike a resulting trust, a constructive trust does not give effect to the imputed/presumed intention of the parties.

=== In United States law ===
==== As corporations ====
In the United States, a trust can be set up as a generic form of a corporation where the settlors (investors) are also the beneficiaries. Trusts such as the Massachusetts business trust have been commonly used in the United States to partition and shield assets from the trustee, multiple beneficiaries, and their respective creditors (particularly the trustee's creditors), making it "bankruptcy remote", and leading to its use in pensions, mutual funds, and asset securitization.

== Remedies ==
Unlike common law remedies, which are largely confined to awards for damages, equitable remedies allow courts to impose a variety of obligations, rights, and prohibitions against parties. These include the injunction, specific performance, account of profits, rescission, rectification, estoppel, constructive trusts, subrogation, liens, compensation, the appointment or removal of a fiduciary, and tracing.

=== Estoppel ===
Estoppel is an equitable remedy that allows a court to estop a party from asserting a legal position. In English law, equitable forms of estoppel include promissory estoppel, which estops a party who promised not to enforce certain rights under a contract from reneging on that promise, and proprietary estoppel, which estops a promissor who led the promisee to rely on the promise of giving the latter title from denying the promisee said title.

== Defences ==
Equitable defences include undue influence, laches, equity's darling, and the clean hands doctrine. In English law, the doctrine of promissory estoppel is also regarded as a defence.

=== Clean hands ===
It is often stated that one who comes into equity must come with clean hands. The requirement of clean hands does not mean that a "bad person" cannot obtain the aid of equity. In D & C Builders Ltd v Rees, Lord Denning refused to apply the equitable doctrine of promissory estoppel, as the defendants in that case had taken advantage of the claimant's financial difficulties to bargain for a lower price without due consideration.

== Other doctrines ==
=== Rights and interests ===
==== Redemption ====
The equity of redemption is the right of a mortgagor (i.e. someone whose property is secured under mortgage by the mortgagee, typically a bank) to redeem their property once the debt discharged. When clauses in a mortgage document impede or "clog" redemption, a court may exercise its equitable jurisdiction in refusing to recognise the validity of the clause.

==== Assignment ====
An equitable assignment is an assignment or transfer of rights in equity.

==== Mortgage ====
Equitable mortgages are security interests that allow an equitable mortgagee to take security over property despite lacking the legal formalities otherwise necessary to establish a mortgage. In Australia, a mere deposit of title documents can give rise to an equitable mortgage, although this rule has now been abolished in England per the Law of Property (Miscellaneous Provisions) Act 1989.

=== Fiduciary duties ===
Trustees have a fiduciary duty to beneficiaries. Typically, the trust itself is not a legal entity and any litigation involving the trust must include the trustee as a party. A trustee may be held personally liable for problems relating to the trust, for example, where assets are not properly invested or where consent by the trustees has not been given in making investment decisions. In the United States, similar to directors and officers, an exculpatory clause may minimize liability; although this was previously held to be against public policy, this position has changed.

=== Property and land ===
An enforceable contract for sale confers an equitable interest on the purchaser of the land, as per the rule established in Lysaght v Edwards. It was similarly held in Walsh v Lonsdale that 'equity looks on as done that which ought to be done'. A contract, which does not meet the requirements of a deed, required by the Law of Property Act 1925 s.52(1), may be specifically enforced to convey the equitable interest to the new purchaser. This rule has had a significant impact because it allows interests that have not been conveyed by a deed to still be binding on future purchasers, through the doctrine of constructive notice.

In English law, Parliament has weakened the impact of this rule, with the Law of Property (Miscellaneous Provisions) Act 1989 s.2 requiring all contracts for the sale of land (which could be specifically enforceable) to be in writing, to contain all the terms of the agreement and be signed by both parties. Any contracts that are not in writing and signed by both parties cannot be specifically enforced and so will not create or transfer an equitable interest in land.

==== Servitudes ====
In United States and Scots law, equitable servitudes refer to a nonpossessory interest in land that operates much like a covenant running with the land. In England and Wales, the concept has been defunct since Tulk v Moxhay.

== In civil and international law ==
Roman law had a well-developed concept analogous to the trust called fideicommissa. These were created by will and enabled a testator to leave property to one person, who was obliged to hand it over to another. These instruments only began to create enforceable legal obligations around the time of the beginning of Roman Empire, when Claudius charged the Consuls with enforcing fideicommissa, which were previously seen as merely morally binding.

The equitable trust is widely considered to be the most innovative contribution of the English legal system. Trusts play a significant role in most common law systems, and their success has led some civil law jurisdictions to incorporate trusts into their civil codes. In Curaçao, for example, the trust was enacted into law on 1 January 2012. France has added a similar, Roman-law-based device to its own law with the fiducie, amended in 2009. Some civil law jurisdictions also recognise the concept under the Hague Convention on the Law Applicable to Trusts and on their Recognition.

In arbitration, the Latin phrase ex aequo et bono refers to the power of arbitrators to dispense with application of the law, if appropriate, and decide solely on what they consider to be fair and equitable in the case at hand. In 1984, the ICJ decided a case using "equitable criteria" in creating a boundary in the Gulf of Maine for Canada and the US. Article 33 of the United Nations Commission on International Trade Law's Arbitration Rules (1976) provides that the arbitrators shall consider only the applicable law unless the arbitral agreement allows the arbitrators to consider ex aequo et bono, or as amiable compositeur, instead. Ex aequo et bono powers are occasionally granted to investor-state tribunals deciding disputes between states and foreign investors, such as in Benvenuti & Bonfant v Republic of the Congo.

== Across common law jurisdictions ==
=== Australia ===
The state of New South Wales is particularly well known for the strength of its equity jurisprudence. However, it was only in 1972 with the introduction of reform to the Supreme Court Act 1970 (NSW) that empowered both the Equity and Common Law Division of the Supreme Court of NSW to grant relief in either equity or common law. In 1972 NSW also adopted one of the essential sections of the Judicature reforms, which emphasised that where there was a conflict between the common law and equity, equity would always prevail. Nevertheless, in 1975 three alumni of Sydney Law School and judges of the NSW Supreme Court, Roddy Meagher, William Gummow and John Lehane produced Equity: Doctrines & Remedies. It remains one of the most highly regarded practitioner texts in Australia and England.

=== India ===
In India the common law doctrine of equity had traditionally been followed even after it became independent in 1947. However, in 1963 the Specific Relief Act was passed by the Parliament of India following the recommendation of the Law Commission of India and repealing the earlier "Specific Relief Act" of 1877. Under the 1963 Act, most equitable concepts were codified and made statutory rights, thereby ending the discretionary role of the courts to grant equitable relief. The rights codified under the 1963 Act were as under:

- Recovery of possession of immovable property (ss. 5–8)
- Specific performance of contracts (ss. 9–25)
- Rectification of instruments (s. 26)
- Recession of contracts (ss. 27–30)
- Cancellation of instruments (ss. 31–33)
- Declaratory decrees (ss. 34–35)
- Injunctions (ss. 36–42)

With this codification, the nature and tenure of the equitable reliefs available earlier have been modified to make them statutory rights and are also required to be pleaded specifically to be enforced. Further to the extent that these equitable reliefs have been codified into rights, they are no longer discretionary upon the courts but instead are enforceable rights subject to the conditions under the 1963 Act being satisfied. Nonetheless, in the event of situations not covered under the 1963 Act, the courts in India continue to exercise their inherent powers per Section 151 of the Code of Civil Procedure 1908, which applies to all civil courts in India.

=== United States ===
In the United States, the federal courts and most state courts have merged law and equity into courts of general jurisdiction, such as county courts. However, the substantive distinction between law and equity has retained its old vitality and remains important in legal practice.

Three states still have separate courts for law and equity: Delaware, whose Court of Chancery is where most cases involving Delaware corporations (which includes a disproportionate number of multi-state corporations) are decided; Mississippi; and Tennessee. However, merger in some states is less than complete; some other states (such as Illinois and New Jersey) have separate divisions for legal and equitable matters in a single court. Virginia had separate law and equity dockets (in the same court) until 2006.

Besides corporate law, which developed out of the law of trusts, areas traditionally handled by chancery courts included wills and probate, adoptions and guardianships, and marriage and divorce. Bankruptcy was also historically considered an equitable matter; although bankruptcy in the United States is today a purely federal matter, reserved entirely to the United States Bankruptcy Courts by the enactment of the United States Bankruptcy Code in 1978, bankruptcy courts are still officially considered "courts of equity" and exercise equitable powers under Section 105 of the Bankruptcy Code.

After US courts merged law and equity, American law courts adopted many of the procedures of equity courts. The procedures in a court of equity were much more flexible than the courts at common law. In American practice, certain devices such as joinder, counterclaim, cross-claim and interpleader originated in the courts of equity.

== See also ==
- Case law
- Economic equity
- Inequity aversion
- Statutory law
