= Liberty Oil Co. v. Condon National Bank =

- Supreme Court of the United States

Argued November 15–16, 1922 Decided November 27, 1922
- Full case name: Liberty Oil Company v. Condon National Bank
- Citations: 260 U.S. 235 (more) 43 S. Ct. 118; 67 L. Ed. 232; 1922 U.S. LEXIS 2364

Case history
- Prior: 271 F. 928
- Subsequent: 291 F. 293

Holding
- A defensive interpleader is an equitable defense authorized to be brought in an action at law by Judicial Code § 274b that is reviewable on appeal as an equity suite rather than by a bill of exceptions thus allowing the United States Circuit Court of Appeals to review the holding of the District Court

Court membership
- Chief Justice William H. Taft Associate Justices Joseph McKenna · Oliver W. Holmes Jr. Willis Van Devanter · Mahlon Pitney; James C. McReynolds · Louis Brandeis; George Sutherland

Case opinion
- Majority: Taft

Laws applied
- Judicial Code §§ 274b, 274a, and 269; Seventh Amendment to the United States Constitution

Liberty Oil Co. v. Condon National Bank, 260 U.S. 235 (1922), was a decision by the Supreme Court of the United States dealing with civil procedure and the nature of taking an appeal from the United States District Court.

== Factual and procedural background ==
Liberty Oil Company, a corporation organized under the laws of Virginia contracted to purchase 160 acres, more or less, of oil lands in Butler County, Kansas, for $1,150,000 from the Atlas Petroleum Company of Oklahoma, C. M. Ball, Isadore Litman, P. G. Keith, and J. H. Keith, residents of Kansas. Pursuant to the contract Liberty Oil Company deposited $100,000 in escrow with the Condon National Bank pursuant to the contract. The escrow was pursuant the term of the contract requiring that the vendors furnish an abstract of title to the property showing a good and marketable title in them. Liberty Oil Co. has seven days to review the abstract of title and if it showed good and marketable title Liberty Oil Co. was to pay the remainder of the purchase price and receive the deeds and possession of the land. If the examination showed a good and marketable title, and the vendee should refuse to pay the money then due from it, the $100,000 was to be delivered to the vendors as liquidated damages. In the event that the examination should disclose that the title was not good and marketable, the Liberty Oil was to notify the vendors, and they were to have 30 days in which to perfect the title, and, should they neglect in that time to do so, the $100,000 on deposit was to be returned to the Liberty Oil. In either case the contract was to become null and void. Liberty Oil claims abstract showed that the title of the vendors was not good and marketable, in that in the chain of title the vendors claimed under the deed of an assignee for the benefit of creditors filed in a Colorado court, but never authorized or confirmed by a court of competent jurisdiction under the laws of Kansas, as required by the law of Kansas, that this defect was not remedied by the vendors within the time required. On July 11, 1918, the plaintiff duly notified Condon National Bank of this and demanded payment of the money deposited. The vendors also demanded the payment of the money deposited. The bank did not pay either.

Liberty Oil brought an action at law against Condon National Bank in the United States District Court for the District of Kansas for the money deposited plus interest. The bank answered admitting the facts alleged except the character of the title. The bank asked that be discharged from liability in a defensive interpleader since:

1. it claimed no interest in the deposit,
2. offered to pay the sum into court or to such person as the court orders
3. asked the vendors be made parties and required to set up their claim to the deposit
4. asked the court make an order as to the disposition of the money, and discharged the bank it be from all liability in connection with the deposit.

The court granted the banks request and the vendors voluntarily appeared, answered, and cross petitioned for the deposits and payment of the purchase price. A jury trial was waived. The court tried the matter and found in a general verdict for the vendors, awarding them the deposit with interest.

Liberty Oil appealed to the Eighth Circuit Court of Appeals claiming the court incorrectly decided the issue of the vendors having good and marketable title. The record of appeal was prepared as either bill of exceptions for writ of error from an action at law or a transcript for an appeal from a suit in equity. The Court of Appeals held that the case was reviewed by writ of error and since the bill of exceptions showed no special findings of fact but only a general finding in a case at law tried without a jury, it lacked power to rule as to the sufficiency of the evidence to sustain the finding so sustained the verdict. Liberty Oil appealed by certiorari to the United States Supreme Court.

== Holding of United States Supreme Court ==
Court held that a defensive interpleader was an equitable defense authorized in an action at law by Judicial Code § 274b added by 38 Stat. 956. An equitable defense should be transferred from the law side of the court to the equity side of the court under Judicial Code § 274a added by 38 Stat. 956 and tried before the legal action and that there was no constitutional right to a jury trial in interpleader. These statues were a step on the way to merger of law and equity but not as fully as in the states with a code of procedures by creating one form of action.

Judicial Code § 269, as amended 40 Stat. 1181, appellate courts are to give judgment after an examination of the record without regard to technical errors, defects, or exceptions which do not affect the substantial rights of the parties, and Judicial Code § 274b, provides whether the review is sought by writ of error or appeal, the appellate court is given to render such judgment upon the record as law and justice shall require. It follows that the court should have considered the issue of law and fact upon which the decree of the district court depended whether there was a good and marketable title. The Supreme Court could have determined the issue of whether there was good and marketable title but did not because the case was not of sufficient public interest to justify that, the case was remanded to the Eighth Circuit Court of Appeals.

== Subsequent history ==
The case was determined on remand by the Eighth Circuit Court of Appeals at 291 F. 293 in 1923.
