= Doctrine of marshalling =

In common law jurisdictions, marshalling is an equitable doctrine applied in the context of lending. It was described by Lord Hoffmann as:

[A] principle for doing equity between two or more creditors, each of whom are owed debts by the same debtor, but one of whom can enforce his claim against more than one security or fund and the other can resort to only one. It gives the latter an equity to require that the first creditor satisfy himself (or be treated as having satisfied himself) so far as possible out of the security or fund to which the latter has no claim.

In the United States, Justice Stone described that:

... [it] rests upon the principle that a creditor having two funds to satisfy his debt may not, by his application of them to his demand, defeat another creditor, who may resort to only one of the funds.

== General principles ==
It has been held that marshalling applies to all forms of secured indebtedness, including liens.

A claim for marshalling will not be allowed by the courts where it would be unjust or unfair to allow the junior creditor to marshal, and therefore:

1. It cannot interfere or prejudice the position of the senior creditor.
2. It cannot prejudice third parties.
3. It must be brought in a fair and timely fashion

Marshalling is not available to a second mortgagee where the first mortgagee is contractually bound to look first to the other property to satisfy the debt due to him.

While quite similar to the doctrine of subrogation, the two are quite distinct equitable remedies:

- Subrogation applies where there is only one debt.
- Subrogation entitles one party to stand in the shoes of another party having repaid indebtedness due to that party, while marshalling requires separate debts due from a debtor to separate secured creditors at the outset.
- The restitutionary principles applicable to subrogation have no application to marshalling.

== United States ==
US jurisprudence has expanded upon the British and Commonwealth authorities, declaring that the requirement for a common debtor means that marshalling is not available where the two funds in question consist of an interest in estate property and an interest in property of a non-debtor, subject to certain exceptions:

1. It has been applied where a non-debtor (typically a corporate debtor's controlling shareholder or guarantor) qualifies as the “alter ego” of the debtor, or where the non-debtor has rendered the debtor inadequately capitalized.
2. The debtor's obligation and not solely the non-debtor's obligation, may equitably be deemed a “capital contribution” to the debtor and hence subject to marshalling.
3. Courts have invoked marshalling where the non-debtor has engaged in inequitable conduct such as fraud, breach of fiduciary duty or unjust enrichment.
4. It has been applied against non-debtor shareholders solely for the equitable purpose of preserving a distribution for the debtor's unsecured creditors.

In certain circumstances, that jurisprudence has also held that, while subrogation may normally render payment of a debt by a guarantor outside the scope of marshalling, equitable subordination may bring the assets of a guarantor within its reach.

== Civil law jurisdictions ==
While marshalling is found only in common law jurisdictions, similar concepts exist in several of those governed by civil law.

Scots law possesses the equivalent doctrine of "catholic securities". Lord Reed, in a 2013 judgment of the United Kingdom Supreme Court, described its effect as being similar to marshalling:

83. Securities are neutral in their effect upon the debtor. Their effect is to strengthen the position of the secured creditor at the expense of unsecured creditors, since the holder of a security holds a right, accessory in nature, which he can exercise to secure the payment of the debt that is distinct from, and additional to, the right of action and execution which any creditor can exercise to enforce the performance of the debtor's personal obligation. The doctrine of catholic securities can therefore operate to the prejudice of unsecured creditors, but it cannot affect the interests of the debtor.

A similar concept is found in Article 2754 of the Civil Code of Quebec, which states:

2754. Where later ranking creditors are secured by a hypothec on only one of the properties charged in favour of one and the same creditor, his hypothec is spread among them, where two or more of the properties are sold under judicial authority and the proceeds still to be distributed are sufficient to pay his claim, proportionately over what remains to be distributed of their respective prices.

Recent jurisprudence has suggested that this provision produces a result equivalent to marshalling.
