= Roddy Meagher =

Australian judge

Roddy Meagher AO, QC
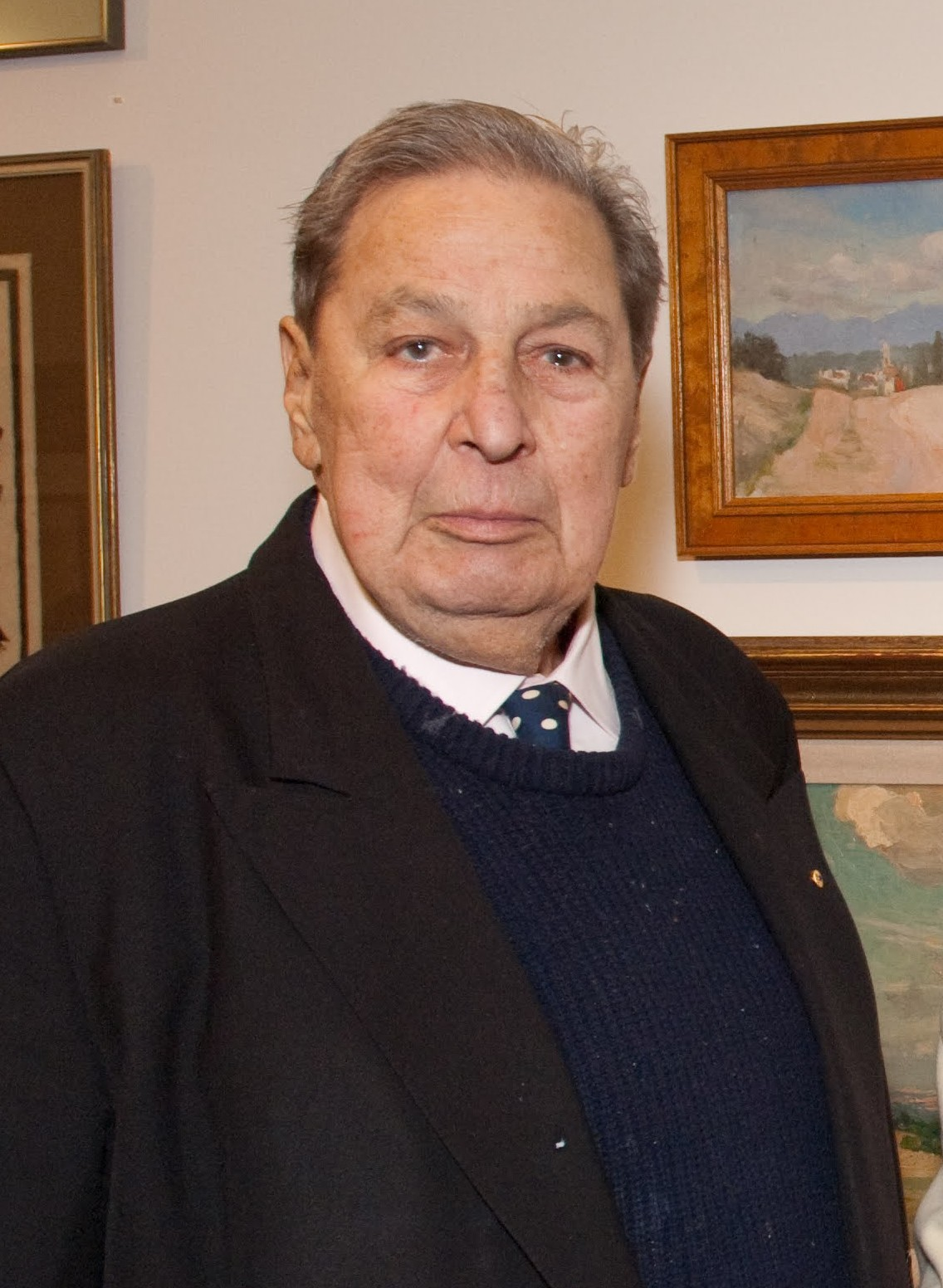
- Meagher in July 2009
- Born: Roderick Pitt Meagher; 17 March 1932; Temora, New South Wales, Australia
- Died: July 3, 2011 (aged 79)
- Education: St Ignatius' College, Riverview; St John's College, University of Sydney
- Spouse: Elma Penelope Moss (m. 1962)
- Relatives: Patrick White (cousin)

Roderick Pitt Meagher AO, QC (17 March 1932 – 3 July 2011), known as Roddy Meagher, was an Australian jurist and judge.

== Early years and education ==
Meagher was a cousin of the writer Patrick White. His family owned a chain of country stores. In 1949, Meagher was Dux of Saint Ignatius' College, Riverview.

Meagher graduated from the University of Sydney with a first class degree in Greek and after a further four years' study at its Law School was awarded the University Medal and a first class law degree. He attended St John's College and was House President there in 1954–5 and, later, a member of its governing Council for many years. As a student he also served on the executive of the Sydney University Newman Society.

In 1962, Meager married the Australian painter Elma Penelope Moss. His third cousin is a New South Wales Court of Appeal judge, Anthony John Meagher.

== Legal career ==
Meagher was called to the NSW Bar in 1960. He lectured at the Faculty of Law at Sydney University within the same year. After taking Silk, Justice Meagher served as President of the New South Wales Bar Association from 1979 to 1981.

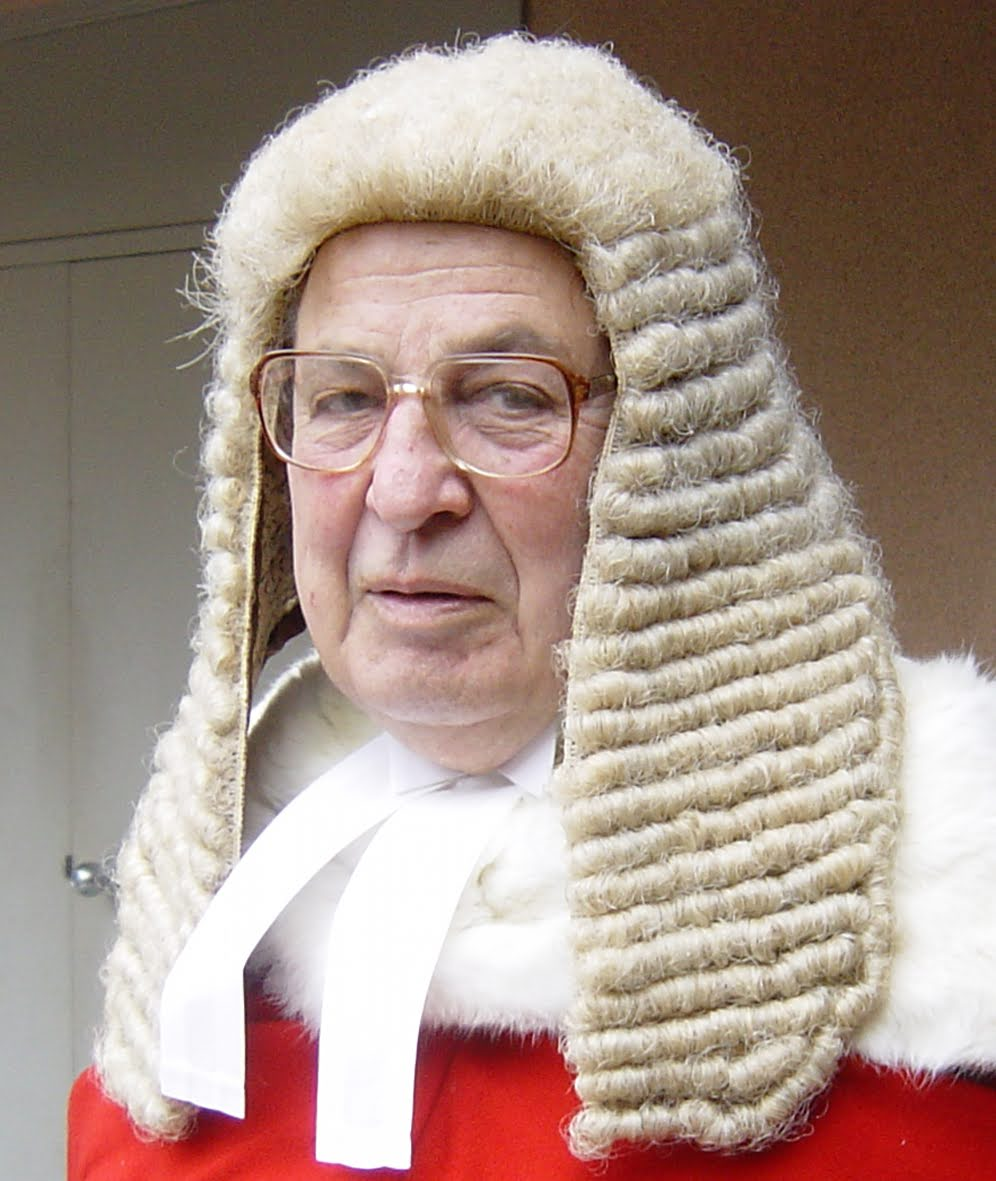
Justice Roddy Meagher wearing ceremonial judicial robes, Sydney, 2004

Meagher was a Justice of the NSW Supreme Court and the Court of Appeal of New South Wales from 1989 to 15 March 2004.

He served as a patron to the Macquarie University's Macquarie Journal of Business Law.

He died on 3 July 2011 at the age of 79.

== Publications ==
With William Gummow he co-edited five editions of Jacobs on Trusts and again with Gummow and Lehane he co-authored Equity: Doctrines and Remedies, the preeminent work on equity in Australia. Meagher has also made various contributions to Quadrant. He was described by NSW Chief Justice James Spigelman as "one of the intellectual giants of our legal history".

Meagher wrote Portraits on Yellow Paper, with illustrations by Simon Fieldhouse. It is his satirical descriptions of friends and colleagues, including Edmund Capon, Ross Edwards, John Howard, Margaret Olley and Laurence Street.

== Honours ==
In 2000 the Senate of the University of Sydney conferred on Meagher—"scholar, lawyer, judge and individualist", as the citation to the Senate called him—the honorary degree of Doctor of Laws (LLD). The Senate was invited to confer the degree on Meagher for his intellectual contributions to the law in particular, referring to the classic text Equity: Doctrines & Remedies, of which Meagher was and remains co-author, as having helped reverse the general decline of equity jurisprudence: "[t]hat book has probably enjoyed greater esteem than any other Australian legal treatise, not only in universities but also with the Bench and Bar in this country, England and elsewhere. There is no equivalent to it in England, the United States or anywhere else". The citation also commended Meagher's service to Sydney Law School, in his capacity since 1960 as lecturer in Roman law and then Challis Lecturer in Equity, commenting that "[h]is lectures were a constant source of inspiration, delight and guidance for generations of law students".

In 2003 Meagher was awarded the St John's College Medal, by the Rector and Fellows, for his outstanding service to the college and to the people of New South Wales. The awarding of this medal is extremely rare.

In 2005 Meagher was admitted as an Officer of the Order of Australia "for service to the judiciary, particularly judicial administration, to reform of the building and construction industry, and to the community through the Australian Naval Reserve and conservation and arts organisations.

== Individual cases and incidents ==
- When John Laws was fined $50,000 for using "gross and coarse" terms on the radio station 2UE, Justice Meagher dissented and called for a jail term, stating that $50,000 was the sort of money Laws would spend "on a small cocktail party."
- Justice Mary Gaudron, in a speech to the Women Lawyers Association of New South Wales, brought Meagher into controversy by deeming his comment that "The bar desperately needs more women barristers [because] there are so many bad ones that people may say that women ... are hopeless by nature" as evidence of a brooding "wilfully unreconstructed" view of women in law.
- He notably opposed the move of Sydney University School of Law from the St James campus on Phillip Street in the CBD to the Camperdown campus, saying, "As long as it was in the city, the school had lots of barristers and solicitors prepared to lecture there, but those people will not be prepared to struggle up to the University. There has never been a close inter-relationship between the professions and the academics in law ... There's a certain amount of co-operation at the moment but even that amount is going to vanish".

== Criticism ==
Patrick Atiyah has criticised Meagher's conservative view of legal doctrine in the Law Quarterly Review. Some considered that Meagher was misogynistic and he was recipient of Ernie Awards for some of his comments, for example about Germaine Greer. However, others were of the view that he deliberately provoked controversy and had in fact supported many women's careers.

== Legacy ==
Meagher was an avid collector of art and bequeathed his extensive collection of works to Sydney Law School. It included paintings by Picasso, Matisse and Manet, as well as by Australian artists including Roland Wakelin, Margaret Preston, and Ian Fairweather.

== Sources ==
- Freeman, Damien (2012). Roddy's Folly: R. P. Meagher QC : Art Lover and Lawyer. Connor Court Pub. ISBN 9781921421778.
