= Union Eagle Ltd v Golden Achievement Ltd =

1997 Privy Council case

- Court: Privy Council
- Citations: [1997] UKPC 5, [1997] AC 514

Court membership
- Judges sitting: Lord Goff of Chieveley, Lord Griffiths, Lord Mustill, Lord Hoffmann, Lord Hope of Craighead

Keywords
- Termination, condition, deposit

Union Eagle Ltd v Golden Achievement Ltd [1997] UKPC 5 is a contract law case concerned with the right to terminate performance of a contract. The case was taken up and resolved by the Judicial Committee of the Privy Council on referral from the Court of Appeal of Hong Kong.

== Facts ==
Union Eagle paid 10% of the HK$4.2m price for a Hong Kong flat as a deposit. Time was said to be "of the essence". Completion was meant to be 5pm 30 September 1991, and clause 12 said failure to complete meant the deposit was forfeit and the agreement rescinded. They were 10 minutes late. Union Eagle sued for specific performance, arguing relying on such a legal right was unconscionable.

== Judgment ==
Lord Hoffmann, delivering judgment, advised that certainty was needed in the business world, particularly in a volatile market. Accordingly, the contract's terms should be strictly enforced, and Union Eagle lost its deposit.

The boundaries of the equitable jurisdiction to relieve against contractual penalties and forfeitures are in some places imprecise. But their Lordships do not think that it is necessary in this case to draw them more exactly because they agree with Litton V.-P. that the facts lie well beyond the reach of the doctrine. The notion that the court's jurisdiction to grant relief is "unlimited and unfettered" (per Lord Simon of Glaisdale in Shiloh Spinners Ltd v. Harding [1973] A.C. 691, 726) was rejected as a "beguiling heresy" by the House of Lords in The Scaptrade (Scandinavian Trading Tanker Co. A.B. v. Flota Petrolera Ecuatoriana [1983] 2 A.C. 694, 700). It is worth pausing to notice why it continues to beguile and why it is a heresy. It has the obvious merit of allowing the court to impose what it considers to be a fair solution in the individual case. The principle that equity will restrain the enforcement of legal rights when it would be unconscionable to insist upon them has an attractive breadth. But the reasons why the courts have rejected such generalisations are founded not merely upon authority (see Lord Radcliffe in Campbell Discount Co. Ltd v. Bridge [1962] A.C. 600, 626) but also upon practical considerations of business. These are, in summary, that in many forms of transaction it is of great importance that if something happens for which the contract has made express provision, the parties should know with certainty that the terms of the contract will be enforced. The existence of an undefined discretion to refuse to enforce the contract on the ground that this would be "unconscionable" is sufficient to create uncertainty. Even if it is most unlikely that a discretion to grant relief will be exercised, its mere existence enables litigation to be employed as a negotiating tactic. The realities of commercial life are that this may cause injustice which cannot be fully compensated by the ultimate decision in the case.

The considerations of this nature, which led the House of Lords in The Scaptrade to reject the existence of an equitable jurisdiction to relieve against the withdrawal of a ship for late payment of hire under a charterparty, are described in a passage from the judgment of Robert Goff L.J. in the Court of Appeal [1983] Q.B. 529, 540-541 which was cited with approval by the House: see [1983] 2 A.C. 694, 703-4. Of course the same need for certainty is not present in all transactions and the difficult cases have involved attempts to define the jurisdiction in a way which will enable justice to be done in appropriate cases without destabilising normal commercial relationships...

...It remains for consideration on some future occasion as to whether the way to deal with the problems which have arisen in such cases is by relaxing the principle in Steedman v Drinkle supra, as the Australian courts have done, or by development of the law of restitution and estoppel. The present case seems to their Lordships to be one to which the full force of the general rule applies. The fact is that the purchaser was late. Any suggestion that relief can be obtained on the ground that he was only slightly late is bound to lead to arguments over how late is too late, which can be resolved only by litigation. For five years the vendor has not known whether he is entitled to resell the flat or not. It has been sterilised by a caution pending a final decision in this case. In his dissenting judgment, Godfrey J.A. said that the case "cries out for the intervention of equity". Their Lordships think that, on the contrary, it shows the need for a firm restatement of the principle that in cases of rescission of an ordinary contract of sale of land for failure to comply with an essential condition as to time, equity will not intervene.

== See also ==
- English contract law
