= United States v. Quiver =

- Supreme Court of the United States

Submitted April 28, 1916 Decided June 12, 1916
- Full case name: United States, plaintiff in error v. Dennis Quiver
- Citations: 241 U.S. 602 (more) 36 S. Ct. 699; 60 L. Ed. 1196

Court membership
- Chief Justice Edward D. White Associate Justices Joseph McKenna · Oliver W. Holmes Jr. William R. Day · Willis Van Devanter; Mahlon Pitney · James C. McReynolds; Louis Brandeis

Case opinion
- Majority: Van Devanter, joined by unanimous

United States v. Quiver, 241 U.S. 602 (1916), is a case decided by the United States Supreme Court after first appearing in United States District Court for the District of South Dakota. The case argued on February 28, 1916 and decided on June 12, 1916 concerned adultery committed on the Pine Ridge Indian Reservation in South Dakota between two enrolled members of the Oglala Sioux Tribe. The district court had held that adultery committed by an Indian with another Indian on an Indian reservation was not punishable under the act of March 3, 1887, c. 397, 24 Stat. 635, now § 316 of the Penal Code. This decision was made because the offense occurred on a Sioux Indian reservation which is not said to be under jurisdiction of the district court. The United States Supreme Court affirmed the judgment of the district court saying that the adultery was not punishable as it had occurred between two American Indians on an American Indian reservation.

Justice Willis Van Devanter delivered the opinion of the court:

This is a prosecution for adultery committed on one of the Sioux Indian Reservations in the state of South Dakota. Both participants in the act were Indians belonging to that reservation. The statute upon which the prosecution is founded was originally adopted as part of the act of March 3, 1887 (chap. 397, 24 Stat. at L. 635), and is now § 316 of the Penal Code [35 Stat. at L. 1149, chap. 321, Comp. Stat. 1913, § 10,489]. The section makes no mention of Indians, and the question for decision is whether it embraces adultery committed by one Indian with another Indian, on an Indian reservation. The district court answered the question in the negative.

...counsel for the government invite attention to the letter of the statute, and urge that adultery is not an offense 'by one Indian against the person or property of another Indian,' and therefore is not within the exception in § 2146 of the Revised Statutes (Comp. Stat. 1913, § 4149).

...And are they not intended to be in accord with the policy reflected by the legislation of Congress and its administration for many years, that the relations of the Indians among themselves-the conduct of one toward another-is to be controlled by the customs and laws of [241 U.S. 602, 606] the tribe, save when Congress expressly or clearly directs otherwise? In our opinion this is the true view.
