= Zechariah Chafee =

American lawyer (1885–1957)

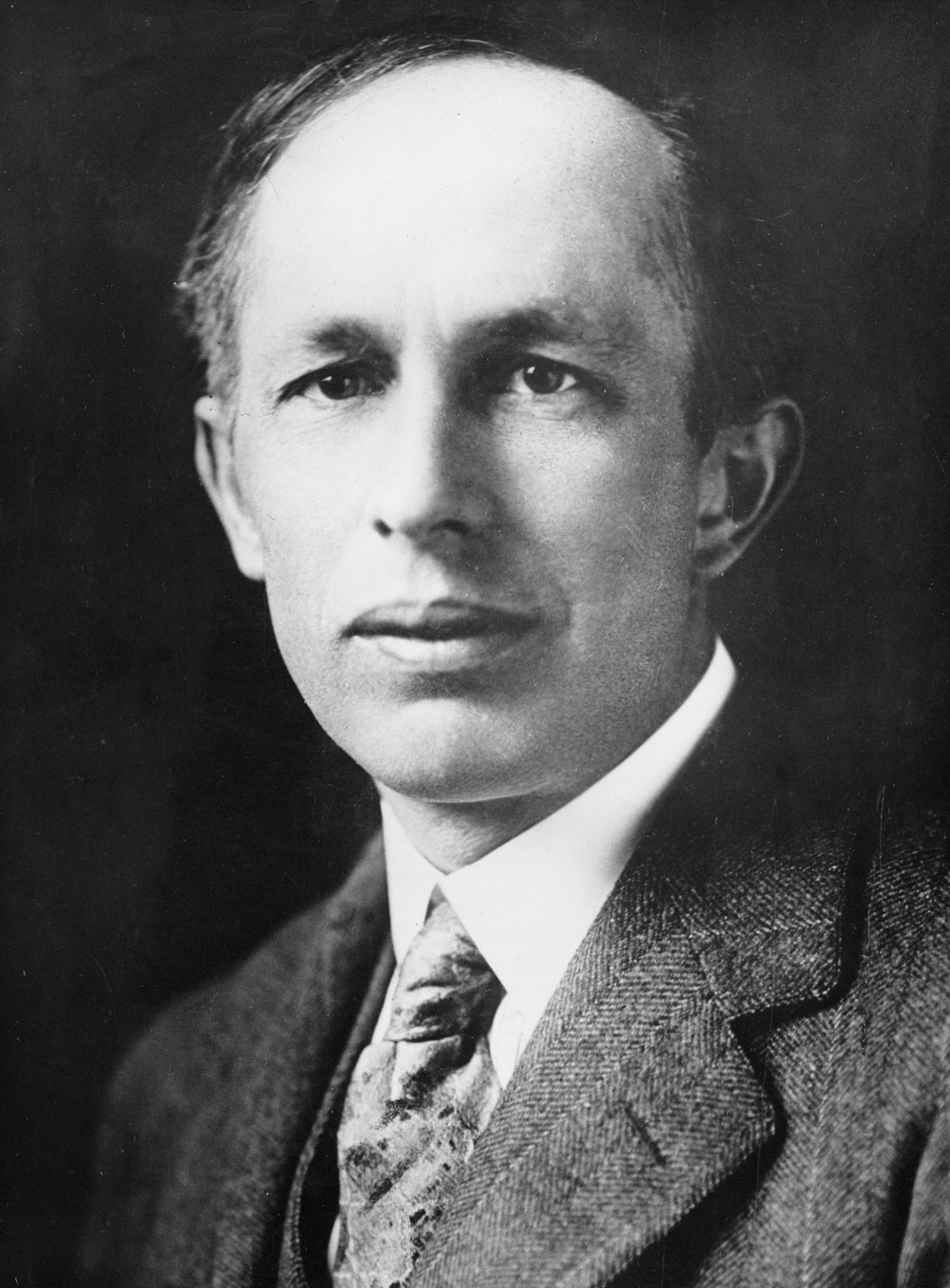
- Zechariah Chafee, 1907
- Born: December 7, 1885; Providence, Rhode Island, U.S.
- Died: February 8, 1957 (aged 71); Boston, Massachusetts, U.S.
- Relatives: John Chafee (nephew); Lincoln Chafee (grandnephew); Louisa Chafee (great-grandniece)

Education
- Education: Brown University (AB); Harvard University (LLB)

Philosophical work
- Era: 20th-century philosophy
- Region: Western philosophy
- School: Philosophy of law
- Main interests: Constitutional law, Freedom of speech, Equity

Zechariah Chafee Jr. (December 7, 1885 – February 8, 1957) was an American judicial philosopher and civil rights advocate, described as "possibly the most important First Amendment scholar of the first half of the twentieth century" by Richard Primus. Chafee's avid defense of freedom of speech led to Senator Joseph McCarthy calling him "dangerous" to America.

== Biography ==
Chafee was born in Providence, Rhode Island, in 1885, and graduated from Brown University in 1907, where he was a member of Alpha Delta Phi. Later, he received a law degree from Harvard University, completing his LL.B. in 1913. He was influenced by the theories of sociological jurisprudence presented by Roscoe Pound and others at Harvard. He met Harold J. Laski, a political scientist and the later Chairman of the British Labour Party, who became a lifelong friend. He practiced at the law firm of Tillinghast & Collins from 1913 to 1916. Chafee joined Harvard Law School as an assistant professor at Harvard Law School in 1916, and was promoted to full professor in 1919. He was appointed Langdell Professor of Law in 1938 and university professor in 1950. He remained at Harvard Law School until 1956.

Chafee was also an authority on equity, interpleader, negotiable instruments, and unfair business competition. In 1936, Chafee drafted the Federal Interpleader Act of 1936 (49 Stat. 1096); he considered this his foremost professional accomplishment. He became an expert on congressional apportionment and helped apportion seats in the United States House of Representatives based on the 1930, 1940 and 1950 censuses.

In 1920, he was one of twelve lawyers reporting on illegal activities of the Department of Justice.

Chafee nearly lost his job in 1921. He was brought before the Harvard Board of Overseers on a charge of radicalism for his questioning of the sentence handed down in Abrams v. United States 250 U.S. 616 (1919). He defended himself eloquently before a special committee in the Harvard Club of Boston and was allowed to remain at the law school.

From 1929 to 1931, Chafee was a consultant to the National Commission on Law Observance and Enforcement (the Wickersham Commission), for which he co-authored a report on lawlessness in law enforcement in 1931.

He was Lowell Television Lecturer for the 1956–1957 academic year and finished a 16 lecture television series "The Constitution and Human Rights", an adaptation of a general education course he developed here in 1950, on Boston's educational Channel, WGBH, just before he died.

Chafee received the following honorary degrees: Doctor of Law from St. John's University, in 1936, Brown University in 1937, and the University of Chicago in 1953; Doctor of Civil Law from Boston University in 1941; and Doctor of Letters from Colby College in 1944.

He was a Fellow at Brown University, and a member of the American Philosophical Society, the American Bar Association, the Colonial Society of Massachusetts, the American Academy of Arts and Sciences, the Massachusetts Historical Society, Alpha Delta Phi, Phi Beta Kappa, the Harvard Club of Boston, the Tavern Club (of Boston), and the Century Association).

=== Civil liberties ===
Chafee wrote several works about civil liberties, including:

- Free Speech (1920)
- Free Speech in the United States, 1941 (expanded edition of Freedom of Speech)
- Government and Mass Communications, 1947
- The Blessings of Liberty, 1956

Freedom of Speech in War Times (1919)

Chafee's first significant work (Freedom of Speech) established modern First Amendment theory. Inspired by the United States' suppression of radical speech and ideas during the First World War, Chafee edited and updated a collection of several of his journal articles. In these individual articles-cum-chapters, he assessed significant World War I cases, including those of Emma Goldman.

When President Roosevelt signed the Smith Act into law in 1940, which raised the penalties for alleged sedition, Chafee characterized it as “one of the most drastic restrictions on freedom of speech ever enacted in the United States during peace." He compared the legislation to “an inscription on a sword. What matters is the existence of the weapon. Once the sword is placed in the hands of the people in power, then, whatever it says, they will be able to reach and slash at almost any unpopular person who is speaking or writing anything that they consider objectionable criticism of their policies.” .

Chafee revised and reissued this work in 1941 as Free Speech in the United States, which became a leading treatise on First Amendment law. His scholarship on civil liberties was a major influence on Oliver Wendell Holmes's and Louis Brandeis's post-World War I jurisprudence, which first established the First Amendment as a significant source of civil liberties. Chafee met with Justice Holmes after the Schenck case 249 U.S. 47 (1919), which upheld a conviction of an activist who encouraged draft resistance, and convinced him that free speech needed greater consideration. Shortly thereafter, Holmes joined Brandeis in a dissent in another World War I dissent case; this dissent is recognized as the foundation of modern First Amendment jurisprudence.

Some of Chafee's more important work occurred through his membership on the American Bar Association's Bill of Rights Committee to 1938 to 1947. In this capacity he submitted briefs amicus curiae several Supreme Court of the United States cases. In (West Virginia State Board of Education v. Barnette,319 U.S. 624 (1943) Chafee submitted a amicus curiae brief to the Supreme Court hoping to persuade the Court to reverse an earlier decision upholding a state law requiring a salute to the flag by children of Jehovah's Witnesses based in the principles of freedom of speech and freedom of religion.

At the request of Senator Burton K. Wheeler, Chafee urged the Bill of Rights Committee to take a public stand against the Sedition of Trial of 1944. The federal government had brought over thirty defendants to Washington, D.C. to prosecute them under the Smith Act. Although the Committee turned down his request, Chafee described the government's entire case as "indefensible."

Chafee was, from 1943 from 1947, vice-chairman of the Commission on the Freedom of the Press (Hutchins Commission). The commission was established in 1943 by Henry Luce to determine if freedom of the press was in danger in the United States and was chaired by Robert Maynard Hutchins.

Chafee became an advocate for international human rights through his work as a representative on the United Nations Subcommission on Freedom of Information and the Press in 1947 through 1951. He was a United States delegate to the 1948 United Nations Conference on Freedom of Information and the Press.

== Family and personal life ==
Chafee married Bess Frank Searle in 1912 and had four children: Zechariah Chafee III, Robert S. Chafee, Anne Chafee Brien, and Ellen Chafee Tillinghast. He and his wife both suffered nervous breakdowns and his son, Robert, committed suicide.

He was the scion of a notable Rhode Island family that traced its Rhode Island lineage back to Roger Williams. His father, Zechariah Chafee (Sr.), was long affiliated with Brown University. Chafee's nephew was United States Senator John Chafee, who was also a former Governor of Rhode Island and U.S. Secretary of the Navy, and his grandnephew Lincoln Chafee is a former Governor of Rhode Island and former U.S. Senator.

== Death ==
Chafee died in Boston, Massachusetts, on February 8, 1957, after suffering a heart attack a few days earlier.

== See also ==
- Imminent lawless action
- Ernst Freund
