= New York Life Insurance Co. v. Dunlevy =

New York Life Ins. Co. v. Dunlevy
- Supreme Court of the United States

Argued May 14–15, 1916 Decided June 5, 1916
- Full case name: New York Life Insurance Company v. Effie J. Gould Dunlevy
- Citations: 241 U.S. 518 (more) 36 S. Ct. 613; 60 L. Ed. 1140

Case history
- Prior: 204 F. 670 (N.D. Cal. 1913); affirmed, 214 F. 1 (9th Cir. 1914); cert. granted, 235 U.S. 705 (1914).

Holding
- No personal jurisdiction can be had over claimants in an interpleader who are physically absent from the state or have not consented to the court's jurisdiction.

Court membership
- Chief Justice Edward D. White Associate Justices Joseph McKenna · Oliver W. Holmes Jr. William R. Day · Charles E. Hughes; Willis Van Devanter · Mahlon Pitney; James C. McReynolds · Louis Brandeis

Case opinion
- Majority: McReynolds

Laws applied
- U.S. Const. Amend. XIV

New York Life Ins. Co. v. Dunlevy, 241 U.S. 518 (1916), was a decision by the Supreme Court of the United States in which the Court held that a court can exert personal jurisdiction over a nonresident party in an interpleader if that party is served with process while physically present within the state.

== Factual and procedural background ==
Joseph W. Gould, obtained a life insurance policy on his life from New York Life Insurance Company which his daughter, Effie J. Gould Dunlevy, claimed had been assigned to her in 1893. At that time both Mr Gould and his daughter were citizens and domiciliaries of Pennsylvania. In 1907, Boggs & Buhl, a law firm, recovered a valid default judgment against Mrs. Dunlevy, in the Common Pleas Court at Pittsburgh here she then resided, after obtaining personal jurisdiction domiciliary service, During 1909, "the tontine dividend period" of the life insurance policy having expired, the insurance company became liable for $2,479.70, and this sum was claimed both by Gould, and his daughter, Mrs. Dunlevy, who had moved to California and became a domiciliary there. In November, 1909, Boggs & Buhl caused issue of an execution attachment on their judgment in Court of Common Pleas at Pittsburgh and both the insurance company and Gould were summoned as garnishees. He appeared, denied assignment of the policy, and claimed the full amount due thereon. On January 14, 1910 Mrs. Dunlevy instituted this suit in the Superior Court, Marin County, California, against the insurance company and to recover $2,479.70, the surrender value of a policy on his life which she claimed had been assigned to her, and both were duly served with process while in that state. On February 5, 1910, after this suit was begun in California, the company answered, admitted its indebtedness, set up the conflicting claims to the fund, and prayed to be advised as to its rights. At the same time it filed a petition asking for an interpleader, and thereby ascertain who was lawfully entitled to the proceeds, and, further, that it might be allowed to pay amount due into court for benefit of proper party.on March 21, 1910 an order granted the requested, and directed that notice be given to Mrs. Dunlevy in California. This was done, but she made no answer and did not appear. Later, the insurance company filed a second petition, and, upon leave obtained thereunder, paid $2,479.70 into court, . All parties except Mrs. Dunlevy having appeared, the suit was tried on a feigned issue to determine validity of alleged transfer of the policy. The jury found, October 1, 1910, there was no valid assignment, and thereupon, under a court order the fund was paid over to Gould. The California suit was removed to the United States district court, February 16, 1910, and tried there by the judge in May, 1912, a jury having been expressly waived. The judgment for Mrs. Dunlevy in amount claimed was affirmed by the Circuit Court of Appeals, Ninth Circuit.

In 1909 under Pennsylvania law, a judgment debtor is not a party to a garnishment proceeding to condemn a claim due the judgment debtor from a third person, nor is the judgment debtor bound by a judgment discharging the garnishee.

== Issue and result ==
The Supreme Court was asked to determine whether the Pennsylvania proceeding was a bar to the action in California. The Supreme Court found for Dunlevy; holding A party to an action does not, after final judgment, still remain in court and subject, without further personal service, to whatsoever orders may be entered under the title of that cause. Interpleader proceedings brought by a garnishee are not essential concomitants of the original action in which the judgment was rendered on which the garnishment is based, but are collateral, and require personal service on the judgment debtor. Smith v. Woolfolk, 115 U.S. 143; Reynolds v. Stockton, 140 U.S. 254; Owens v. Henry, 161 U.S. 642; Hovey v. Elliott, 167 U.S. 409; Freeman on Judgments, 4th ed., § 143. Any personal judgment which a state court may render against one not voluntarily submitting to its jurisdiction, nor a domiciliary of the state nor served with process within its border, no matter what the mode of service, is void because the court has no personal jurisdiction. Pennoyer v. Neff, 95 U.S. 714.

== Subsequent history ==
The Federal Interpleader Act of 1917 39 Stat. 929 was enacted by the 64th United States Congress approved February 22, 1917 to over come this problem in this case for insurance companies to bring an interpleader against beneficiaries in different states. Federal Interpleader Act of 1917 allowed an insurance company, or fraternal benefit society subject to multiple claims on the same policy to file a suit in equity by a bill of interpleader in United States District Courts and providing nationwide service of process, minimal diversity jurisdiction of two or more of the beneficiaries must live in different states and a lower amount in controversy of at least $500.

== See also ==
- List of United States Supreme Court cases, volume 241
- List of United States Supreme Court cases
