= Contribution claim (legal) =

A contribution claim is a claim brought by one or more defendants to a lawsuit for money damages brought by a plaintiff. A contribution claim asserts the party (usually a defendant) is entitled to "contribution" from a third party for any money damages awarded to the plaintiff.

For example, if a plaintiff sues a homeowner for damages caused by a garage door, the defendant homeowner could add a third party, the manufacturer of the garage door to contribute to any damages awarded to the plaintiff according to the proportionate share of responsibility, liability, or fault assigned to the homeowner and the manufacturer by the jury.

In most cases, contribution claims are brought like the original lawsuit itself. The claim must be personally served on the new, third party defendant, by the third party plaintiff (the defendant bringing the claim for contribution relief). In contrast, a counter-claim asserts that the party (usually a defendant) is entitled to offset the damages awarded to plaintiff by the proportionate share of any responsibility, liability, or fault assigned to the plaintiff by the jury. Finally, a cross-claim is the same as a counter-claim or contribution claim, except that it is asserted by a defendant against other defendants. Counter-claims and cross claims do not require personal service because no new parties are being added to the lawsuit.

In some state court systems, a contribution claim must be opened as a new case, and thus the defendant must pay for a filing fee, docket number, or index number. In other states, however, no additional fee is required.

== See also ==
- Joint and several liability
- Tort law
