= Specific Relief Act, 1963 =

Act of the Parliament of India

Parliament of India
- Long title: An Act to define and amend the law relating to certain kinds of specific relief.
- Citation: Act No. 47 of 1963
- Territorial extent: whole of India
- Enacted by: Parliament of India
- Assented to by: President Sarvepalli Radhakrishnan
- Assented to: 13 December 1963
- Commenced: 1 March 1964

Repeals
- Specific Relief Act, 1877 (1 of 1877)
- Status: In force

The Specific Relief Act, 1963 is an Act of the Parliament of India which provides remedies for persons whose civil or contractual rights have been violated. It replaced an earlier Act of 1877. The following kinds of remedies may be granted by a court under the provisions of the Specific Relief Act:

- Recovery of possession of property
- Specific performance of contracts
- Rectification of instruments
- Rescission of contracts
- Cancellation of Instruments
- Declaratory decrees
- Injunction

== Recovery of possession of property ==
The first chapter provides relief to those who have been dispossessed of their property. —Nair Services Society Vs. K C Alexander [All India Reporter] AIR Year of Judgment-1968 SC [Supreme Court of India] Page No.1165—No suit for dispossession against the government is maintainable under Specific Relief Act.

== Specific performance of contracts ==
The base of almost all economic relations are made of contracts. Every profession is contract bound. Property, whether owned by businesses or individuals are locked up under contracts. For example, money in banks and other forms of investment are contractually bound. As a result, contracts constitute modern wealth. They are sacred per se. Moreover a particular contract is not an isolated transaction. Often it is a link in the chain of several contracts. A failure at one place could cause serious dislocation to economic and social life. Contracts, thus must be enforced. But awarding compensation to an injured person is the only way that the law of contract can enforce a contract. However, in many cases compensation fails to serve the economic purpose of a contract. For example, a hospital is interested in the fulfillment of its requirements and not in receiving compensation from a failed supplier. Thus there was a need for a remedy which would compel a defaulting contractor to actually perform his contract.

== Rectification and cancellation of instruments and rescission of contracts ==
By law, many transactions are required to be in writing. Because of expediency, many more transactions are put into writing. A written transaction is called an instrument. An instrument is a result of negotiations. Sometimes, an instrument may fail to express the intention of the involved parties. Rectification of such an instrument may become necessary. Help towards parties who want to have their documents (which are mistakenly executed) rectified, is provided in Chapter III of the Specific Relief Act. Closely related with documents mistakenly executed, is the category of documents which are at a later point found to be void or which become void. These documents ought to be cancelled. Chapter V provides relief from such kinds of documents. Also, there is a category of contracts which, for some reason or the other (e.g. lack of free consent) can be deemed voidable by the party which consent was not free. This party has the right to have the contract rescinded. Relief by way of rescission is provided by Chapter IV of the Specific Relief Act.

== Preventive relief ==
There can be cases where the nature of the contract does not allow damages to likely serve any purpose nor admit to specific performance. In such cases, the court may have to restrain the party who threatens the breach, to the possible extent. For example, a person undertakes a contract to sing at a particular place and also undertakes not to sing anywhere else during the same period. In case the singer threatens breach, the court cannot force him to sing. The positive side of the bargain is not specifically enforceable. But the negative undertaking i.e. not to sing elsewhere, can be enforced by restraining him from singing elsewhere. When he is prevented from resorting to other openings, it may exert some pressure upon his mind and he may be persuaded to go ahead with the performance of his contract. This type of remedy is known as preventive relief. This is granted by issuing an order known as injunction. Injunction is an order issued upon the party concerned directing him/them to omit the performance of a particular duty or act. This is also known as a mandatory injunction. Such relief is granted under the provisions of Part III of the Act.

== Declaratory relief ==
This is the final matter which is taken care of by the Specific Relief Act. Sometimes it may happen, that a person who is entitled to some status or character or has a right in some property but is being denied the enjoyment of his right by other parties. Under Chapter VI of the Specific Relief Act, he is allowed to proceed against any person who is denying or is interested in denying him his right. Ushaben V. Bhagayalakshmi
