= Equity: Doctrines and Remedies =

Legal text

Meagher, Gummow & Lehane's Equity: Doctrines and Remedies is a scholarly legal text originally composed by three Australian judges, Roddy Meagher, William Gummow and John Lehane. It is the preeminent publication on Equity in both Australia and England.

The book is now in its fifth edition. The current authors are Dyson Heydon KC (former Justice of the High Court of Australia), Justice Mark Leeming (a Judge of the New South Wales Court of Appeal) and Dr Peter Turner (a Fellow at the University of Melbourne).

The book is divided into the following parts:

- The Background of Equity
- The Basic Concepts of Equity
- Assurances and Assignments
- Unconscionable Transactions
- Remedies
- Deceased Estates
- Equitable Defences
- Miscellaneous Doctrines

== Publishing details ==
- RP Meagher, WMC Gummow and JRF Lehane, Equity, Doctrines and Remedies (Butterworths, 1st ed, 1975) ISBN 0-409-49152-7
- JD Heydon, MJ Leeming, PG Turner, Meagher, Gummow & Lehane's Equity: Doctrine and Remedies (LexisNexis, 5th ed, 2015).
