= Robert Stevens (legal scholar) =

Robert Stevens is the Herbert Smith Freehills Professor of English Private Law at the University of Oxford, a position he took up in 2012. He is (as of March 2023) the convenor of the Commercial Remedies course on the Bachelor of Civil Law. Previously he was a professor in commercial law at University College, London, a lecturer in law at the University of Oxford and a fellow and tutor in law at Lady Margaret Hall, where he taught from 1994 to 2007. He has published within the following areas: contract law; insolvency law; private international law; restitution; tort; and trust law.

He read law as an undergraduate at the University of Oxford, where he also studied for the Bachelor of Civil Law. He was called to the Bar in 1992. He has taught and lectured widely both within the Commonwealth (Australia and Canada) and Continental Europe (Germany, the Netherlands, Spain).
