= Implied trust =

Element of trust law

An implied trust is an element of trust law, and refers to a trust that has not been "expressly created by the settlor." There are two types of implied trust:

- Resulting trust
- Constructive trust
