= Penny Meagher =

Australian artist (1935–1995)

Elma Penelope Meagher
- Born: Elma Penelope Moss; 1935; Sydney, Australia
- Died: 5 June 1995 (aged 59–60); Sydney, Australia
- Education: University of Sydney
- Known for: Painting
- Spouse: Roddy Meagher (m. 1962)

Elma Penelope Meagher (1935 – 5 June 1995), better known as Penny Meagher, was an Australian painter.

Penny Meagher was born in Sydney, and started drawing from an early age. She was educated at Ascham School, Edgecliff and Frensham School, Mittagong. She studied economics at the University of Sydney.

In the late 1960s, Penny Meagher became a director of the Macquarie Galleries in Sydney.
