= List of United States Supreme Court cases, volume 241 =

Supreme Court of the United States
- Interactive map of Supreme Court of the United States
- 38°53′26″N 77°00′16″W
- Established: March 4, 1789; 236 years ago
- Location: Washington, D.C.
- Coordinates: 38°53′26″N 77°00′16″W
- Composition method: Presidential nomination with Senate confirmation
- Authorised by: Constitution of the United States, Art. III, § 1
- Judge term length: life tenure, subject to impeachment and removal
- Number of positions: 9 (by statute)
- Website: supremecourt.gov

This is a list of cases reported in volume 241 of United States Reports, decided by the Supreme Court of the United States in 1916.

== Justices of the Supreme Court at the time of volume 241 U.S. ==
The Supreme Court is established by Article III, Section 1 of the Constitution of the United States, which says: "The judicial Power of the United States, shall be vested in one supreme Court . . .". The size of the Court is not specified; the Constitution leaves it to Congress to set the number of justices. Under the Judiciary Act of 1789 Congress originally fixed the number of justices at six (one chief justice and five associate justices). Since 1789 Congress has varied the size of the Court from six to seven, nine, ten, and back to nine justices (always including one chief justice).

When the cases in volume 241 were decided the Court comprised the following eight members, following Justice Lamar's death in January 1916:

Portrait	Justice	Office	Home State	Succeeded	Date confirmed by the Senate (Vote)	Tenure on Supreme Court
	Edward Douglass White	Chief Justice	Louisiana	Melville Fuller	December 12, 1910 (Acclamation)	December 19, 1910 – May 19, 1921 (Died)
	Joseph McKenna	Associate Justice	California	Stephen Johnson Field	January 21, 1898 (Acclamation)	January 26, 1898 – January 5, 1925 (Retired)
	Oliver Wendell Holmes Jr.	Associate Justice	Massachusetts	Horace Gray	December 4, 1902 (Acclamation)	December 8, 1902 – January 12, 1932 (Retired)
	William R. Day	Associate Justice	Ohio	George Shiras Jr.	February 23, 1903 (Acclamation)	March 2, 1903 – November 13, 1922 (Retired)
	Charles Evans Hughes	Associate Justice	New York	David Josiah Brewer	May 2, 1910 (Acclamation)	October 10, 1910 – June 10, 1916 (Resigned)
	Willis Van Devanter	Associate Justice	Wyoming	Edward Douglass White (as Associate Justice)	December 15, 1910 (Acclamation)	January 3, 1911 – June 2, 1937 (Retired)
	Mahlon Pitney	Associate Justice	New Jersey	John Marshall Harlan	March 13, 1912 (50–26)	March 18, 1912 – December 31, 1922 (Resigned)
	James Clark McReynolds	Associate Justice	Tennessee	Horace Harmon Lurton	August 29, 1914 (44–6)	October 12, 1914 – January 31, 1941 (Retired)

== Citation style ==
Under the Judiciary Act of 1789 the federal court structure at the time comprised District Courts, which had general trial jurisdiction; Circuit Courts, which had mixed trial and appellate (from the US District Courts) jurisdiction; and the United States Supreme Court, which had appellate jurisdiction over the federal District and Circuit courts—and for certain issues over state courts. The Supreme Court also had limited original jurisdiction (i.e., in which cases could be filed directly with the Supreme Court without first having been heard by a lower federal or state court). There were one or more federal District Courts and/or Circuit Courts in each state, territory, or other geographical region.

The Judiciary Act of 1891 created the United States Courts of Appeals and reassigned the jurisdiction of most routine appeals from the district and circuit courts to these appellate courts. The Act created nine new courts that were originally known as the "United States Circuit Courts of Appeals." The new courts had jurisdiction over most appeals of lower court decisions. The Supreme Court could review either legal issues that a court of appeals certified or decisions of court of appeals by writ of certiorari. On January 1, 1912, the effective date of the Judicial Code of 1911, the old Circuit Courts were abolished, with their remaining trial court jurisdiction transferred to the U.S. District Courts.

Bluebook citation style is used for case names, citations, and jurisdictions.

- "# Cir." = United States Court of Appeals
  - e.g., "3d Cir." = United States Court of Appeals for the Third Circuit
- "D." = United States District Court for the District of . . .
  - e.g.,"D. Mass." = United States District Court for the District of Massachusetts
- "E." = Eastern; "M." = Middle; "N." = Northern; "S." = Southern; "W." = Western
  - e.g.,"M.D. Ala." = United States District Court for the Middle District of Alabama
- "Ct. Cl." = United States Court of Claims
- The abbreviation of a state's name alone indicates the highest appellate court in that state's judiciary at the time.
  - e.g.,"Pa." = Supreme Court of Pennsylvania
  - e.g.,"Me." = Supreme Judicial Court of Maine

== List of cases in volume 241 U.S. ==
Case Name	Page and year	Opinion of the Court	Concurring opinion(s)	Dissenting opinion(s)	Lower Court	Disposition
Chin Fong v. Backus	1 (1916)	McKenna	none	none	N.D. Cal.	dismissed
Kelly v. Griffin	6 (1916)	Holmes	none	none	N.D. Ill.	affirmed
Osborne v. Gray	16 (1916)	Hughes	none	none	Tenn.	affirmed
G. and C. Merriam Co. v. Saalfield and Ogilvie	22 (1916)	Pitney	none	none	N.D. Ohio	affirmed
Texas and Pacific Railway Company v. Rigsby	33 (1916)	Pitney	none	none	5th Cir.	affirmed
Richardson v. Fajardo Sugar Company	44 (1916)	McReynolds	none	none	D.P.R.	affirmed
Rosenberger v. Pacific Express Company	48 (1916)	White	none	none	Mo.	reversed
Menasha Paper Company v. Chicago and Northwestern Railroad Company	55 (1916)	McKenna	none	none	Wis.	affirmed
United States v. New South Farm and Home Company	64 (1916)	McKenna	none	none	S.D. Fla.	reversed
United States v. Lombardo	73 (1916)	McKenna	none	none	W.D. Wash.	affirmed
McFarland v. American Sugar Refining Company	79 (1916)	Holmes	none	none	E.D. La.	affirmed
Northern Pacific Railroad Company v. Wall	87 (1916)	VanDevanter	none	McReynolds	Mont.	reversed
Gidney v. Chappel	99 (1916)	VanDevanter	none	none	Okla.	affirmed
Lámar v. United States	103 (1916)	White	none	none	2d Cir.	affirmed
United States v. Archer	119 (1916)	McKenna	none	Pitney	Ct. Cl.	reversed
White v. United States	149 (1916)	McKenna	none	none	Ct. Cl.	reversed
De la Rama v. De la Rama	154 (1916)	Holmes	none	none	Phil.	affirmed
Johnson v. Root Manufacturing Company	160 (1916)	Holmes	none	none	7th Cir.	affirmed
The Raithmoor	166 (1916)	Hughes	none	none	E.D. Pa.	reversed
Chicago, Burlington and Quincy Railroad Company v. Harrington	177 (1916)	Hughes	none	none	Mo. Ct. App.	affirmed
Kansas City Southern Railway Company v. Jones	181 (1916)	McReynolds	none	none	La.	reversed
Maryland Dredging and Contracting Company v. United States	184 (1916)	Holmes	none	none	Ct. Cl.	affirmed
Georgia Florida and Alabama Railroad Company v. Blish Milling Company	190 (1916)	Hughes	none	none	Ga. Ct. App.	affirmed
Stowe v. Harvey	199 (1916)	McReynolds	none	none	9th Cir.	affirmed
Lane v. United States ex rel. Mickadiet	201 (1916)	White	none	none	D.C. Cir.	reversed
Minneapolis and St. Louis Railway Company v. Bombolis	211 (1916)	White	none	none	Minn.	affirmed
St. Louis and San Francisco Railroad Company v. Brown	223 (1916)	White	none	none	Okla.	affirmed
Jacobs v. Southern Railroad Company	229 (1916)	McKenna	none	none	Va.	affirmed
Baugham v. New York, Philadelphia and Norfolk Railroad Company	237 (1916)	McKenna	none	none	Va.	affirmed
Chesapeake and Ohio Railway Company v. Carnahan	241 (1916)	McKenna	none	none	Va.	affirmed
Pacific Mail Steamship Company v. Schmidt	245 (1916)	Holmes	none	none	9th Cir.	reversed
Terminal Taxicab Company, Inc. v. Kutz	252 (1916)	Holmes	none	none	D.C. Cir.	affirmed
American Well Works Company v. Layne and Bowler Company	257 (1916)	Holmes	none	none	E.D. Ark.	reversed
Louisville and Nashville Railroad Company v. Stewart	261 (1916)	Holmes	none	none	Ky.	affirmed
United States v. Coca Cola Company of Atlanta	265 (1916)	Hughes	none	none	6th Cir.	reversed
Seaboard Air Line Railroad Company v. Renn	290 (1916)	VanDevanter	none	none	N.C.	affirmed
Bankers Trust Company v. Texas and Pacific Railroad Company	295 (1916)	VanDevanter	none	none	N.D. Tex.	affirmed
Chesapeake and Ohio Railway Company v. De Atley	310 (1916)	Pitney	none	none	Ky.	reversed
Cincinnati, New Orleans and Texas Pacific Railway Company v. Rankin	319 (1916)	McReynolds	none	none	Tenn.	reversed
Wisconsin v. Philadelphia and Reading Coal and Iron Company	329 (1916)	McReynolds	none	none	W.D. Wis.	affirmed
Southern Railroad Company v. Gray	333 (1916)	McReynolds	none	none	N.C.	reversed
Brazee v. Michigan	340 (1916)	McReynolds	none	none	Mich.	affirmed
Spokane and Inland Empire Railroad Company v. United States	344 (1916)	White	none	none	9th Cir.	affirmed
Cubbins v. Mississippi River Commission	351 (1916)	White	none	none	N.D. Miss.	affirmed
Atchison, Topeka and Santa Fe Railway Company v. Harold	371 (1916)	White	none	none	Kan.	reversed
United States v. Hemmer	379 (1916)	McKenna	none	none	8th Cir.	affirmed
Merrill-Ruckgaber Company v. United States	387 (1916)	McKenna	none	none	Ct. Cl.	affirmed
United States v. Jin Fuey Moy	394 (1916)	Holmes	none	none	W.D. Pa.	affirmed
Russo-Chinese Bank v. National Bank of Commerce of Seattle	403 (1916)	Hughes	none	none	9th Cir.	affirmed
St. Louis and Kansas City Land Company v. City of Kansas City	419 (1916)	Hughes	none	none	Mo.	affirmed
Levindale Lead and Zinc Mining Company v. Coleman	432 (1916)	Hughes	none	none	Okla.	reversed
Pacific Live Stock Company v. Lewis	440 (1916)	VanDevanter	none	none	D. Or.	affirmed
Montelibano y Ramos v. La Compania General de Tabacos de Filipinas	455 (1916)	Pitney	none	none	Phil.	affirmed
Chesapeake and Ohio Railway Company v. Proffitt	462 (1916)	Pitney	none	none	4th Cir.	affirmed
Chicago and Northwestern Railroad Company v. Bower	470 (1916)	Pitney	none	none	Neb.	affirmed
San Antonio and Aransas Pass Railway Company v. Wagner	476 (1916)	Pitney	none	none	Tex. Civ. App.	affirmed
Chesapeake and Ohio Railway Company v. Kelly	485 (1916)	Pitney	none	none	Ky.	reversed
Chesapeake and Ohio Railway Company v. Gainey	494 (1916)	Pitney	none	none	Ky.	reversed
Spokane and Inland Empire Railroad Company v. Campbell	497 (1916)	Pitney	none	none	9th Cir.	affirmed
Bingham v. Bradley	511 (1916)	Pitney	none	none	N.D. Ill.	affirmed
New York Life Insurance Company v. Dunlevy	518 (1916)	McReynolds	none	none	9th Cir.	affirmed
Duel v. Hollins	523 (1916)	McReynolds	none	Pitney	2d Cir.	reversed
Virginia v. West Virginia	531 (1916)	White	none	none	original	writ of execution denied
Missouri v. Chicago, Burlington and Quincy Railroad Company	533 (1916)	White	none	none	original	procedural motion granted
Reid v. Fargo	544 (1916)	White	none	none	2d Cir.	reversed
Lancaster v. Kathleen Oil Company	551 (1916)	White	none	none	E.D. Okla.	reversed
New York ex rel. Kennedy v. Becker	556 (1916)	White	none	none	N.Y. Sup. Ct.	affirmed
Ohio ex rel. Davis v. Hildebrant	565 (1916)	White	none	none]	Ohio	affirmed
Brown v. Pacific Coast Coal Company	571 (1916)	Holmes	none	none	9th Cir.	reversed
Knights of Pythias v. Mims	574 (1916)	Holmes	none	none	Tex. Civ. App.	reversed
Southern Surety Company v. Oklahoma	582 (1916)	VanDevanter	none	none	Oklahoma	affirmed
Dayton v. Stanard	588 (1916)	VanDevanter	none	none	8th Cir.	affirmed
United States v. Nice	591 (1916)	VanDevanter	none	none	D.S.D.	reversed
United States v. Quiver	602 (1916)	VanDevanter	none	none	D.S.D.	affirmed
Abbott v. Brown	606 (1916)	Pitney	none	none	S.D. Fla.	reversed
Mutual Life Insurance Company v. Hilton-Green	613 (1916)	McReynolds	none	none	5th Cir.	reversed
Holmes v. Conway	624 (1916)	McReynolds	none	none	Kan.	affirmed
