= Subrogation =

Legal doctrine whereby a person is entitled to enforce the rights of another

Subrogation is the assumption by a third party (a subrogee, such as a second creditor or an insurance company) of another party (a subrogor)'s legal right to collect debts or damages. It is a legal doctrine whereby one person is entitled to enforce the subsisting or revived rights of another for their own benefit. A right of subrogation typically arises by operation of law, but can also arise by statute or by agreement. Subrogation is an equitable remedy, having first developed in the English Court of Chancery. It is a familiar feature of common law systems. Analogous doctrines exist in civil law jurisdictions.

Subrogation is a relatively specialised legal field; entire legal textbooks are devoted to the subject.

== Doctrine ==
Countries which have inherited the common law system will typically have a doctrine of subrogation, but its doctrinal basis in a particular jurisdiction may vary from that in other jurisdictions, depending upon the extent to which equity remains a distinct body of law in that jurisdiction.

English courts have now accepted that the concept of unjust enrichment has a role to play in subrogation. In contrast, this approach has been stridently rejected by the High Court of Australia, where the doctrinal basis of subrogation is said to lie in the prevention of unconscionable results: for example, the discharge of a debtor or one party obtaining double recovery.

== Types ==
The situations in which subrogation will be available are not closed and vary from jurisdiction to jurisdiction. Subrogation typically arises in three-party situations. Some common examples of subrogation include:

- Indemnity insurance. An indemnity insurer may be entitled to be subrogated to the rights of insured as against a third party who is responsible for the damage to the insured.
- Law of guarantees. A surety may be entitled to be subrogated to the rights of the creditor as against the principal debtor.
- Trust creditors. A creditor of a trustee may be entitled to be subrogated to the trustee's right of indemnity.
- Subrogation to outgoing securities. A lender who advances funds for the purpose of discharging a security may be entitled to be subrogated to the third party's security as against the borrower.
- Bills of exchange. The indorser of a bill of exchange may be entitled to be subrogated to the holder as against the acceptor (who is liable to indemnify the indorser).

=== Indemnity insurer's subrogation rights ===
"Subrogation" has been used in this context to refer to two distinct situations.

First, after paying out under a policy of indemnity insurance, an insurer may be entitled to stand in the shoes of the insured and enforce the insured's rights against the third party tortfeasor who is responsible for the loss. This is subrogation in its proper or core sense. Insurance subrogation, and, specifically, the types and amounts of payments that can be recovered, differs from jurisdiction to jurisdiction.

Secondly, after paying out under a policy of indemnity insurance, an insurer may be entitled to sue the insured where the insured has already had his loss made good by the third party tortfeasor. That is, the insurer has a claim against the insured so as to ensure that the insured does not get double recovery. This situation might arise if, for example, an insured claimed in full under the policy, but then started proceedings against the third party tortfeasor, and recovered substantial damages. Strictly speaking, this is not a case of subrogation; it is a case of recoupment.

=== Travel insurance subrogation process ===
In an "excess" or "supplemental" travel insurance policy where there is a 'first payer' clause, through the subrogation process an insurer is legally entitled to seek cost-sharing up to a certain percentage from a member's private group health insurance provider after the insurer pays out a travel insurance claim.

While these supplemental travel insurance policies may be less expensive in the short run, they can have devastating consequences if a serious and costly health crisis occurs while travelling. That means that if a client makes a claim, the insurer will recover that amount from the member's private group health insurance provider such as $100,000 of the $200,000 total. That can become problematic if the member later has a serious illness because many private group health insurance providers have a lifetime maximum coverage amount, such as $500,000, for its extended health plans. If the member purchases travel insurance from their own extended health-care provider, a claim would not have affected the lifetime maximum.

=== Surety's subrogation rights ===
A surety who pays off the debts of another party may be entitled to be subrogated to the creditor's former claims and remedies against the debtor to recover the sum paid. That would include the endorser on a bill of exchange. The surety will then have the benefit of any security interest in favour of the creditor for the original debt. Conceptually this is an important point, as the subrogee will take the subrogor's security rights by operation of law, even if the subrogee had been unaware of them.

=== Subrogation rights against trustees ===
A trustee of who enters into transactions for the benefit of the beneficiaries of the trust is generally entitled to be indemnified out of the trust assets; this is secured by way of an equitable lien or first charge over the trust assets. This is a proprietary security interest.

Trust creditors (that is, persons who have become creditors of the trustee qua trustee) may be entitled to be subrogated to the trustee's lien. This is a particularly precarious 'right' of trust creditors: a trustee may not have a right of indemnity (for example, because the trustee has committed a breach of trust in incurring the liability to the creditor in question) or it may be limited (for example, where the trustee has committed an unrelated breach of trust and the clear accounts rule operates). In some jurisdictions it is possible for the trustee's right of indemnity to be excluded altogether. In these cases, subrogation may be rendered worthless or impossible.

=== Lender's subrogation rights ===
Where a lender lends money to a borrower to discharge the borrower's debt to a third party (or which the lender pays directly to the third party to discharge the debt), the lender may be entitled to be subrogated to the third party's former rights against the borrower to the extent of the debt discharged.

=== Miscellaneous ===
Where a bank, acting on what it believes erroneously to be the valid mandate of its client, pays money to a third party which discharges the customer's liability to the third party, the bank is subrogated to the third party's former remedies against the customer.

== Effects ==
If subrogation is available, the subrogated party is entitled to stand in the shoes of another and enforce that other party's rights. If the equity is established, the court may effect the subrogation remedy by way of equitable lien, charge, or a constructive trust with a liability to account. Crucially, the claimant's rights are wholly derivative, hence the claimant has no higher rights than the person to whom he or she is subrogated.

== Waiver of subrogation ==
In practice insurers may agree to a waiver of their subrogation rights.

== Subrogation in case law ==
In the United States, in River Junction v Maryland Casualty Co. (1943), the U.S. Court of Appeals for the Fifth Circuit held that the assignee (the bank), should properly be subrogated to the rights of the owner, and not the surety.

== Subrogation in civil law jurisdictions ==
Analogous doctrines exist in civil law countries; for example, Articles 1651-1659 of the Civil Code of Quebec deal with subrogation under Quebec's civil law:

A person who pays in the place of a debtor may be subrogated to the rights of the creditor.
He does not have more rights than the subrogating creditor.

== See also ==
- Assignment (law)
