= Counterclaim =

Claim asserted by one party in response to the claim of another

In a court of law, a party's claim is a counterclaim if one party asserts claims in response to the claims of another. In other words, if a plaintiff initiates a lawsuit and a defendant responds to the lawsuit with claims of their own against the plaintiff, the defendant's claims are "counterclaims."

== Examples ==
Examples of counterclaims include:

- After a bank has sued a customer for an unpaid debt, the customer counterclaims (sues back) against the bank for fraud in procuring the debt. The court will sort out the different claims in one lawsuit (unless the claims are severed).
- Two cars collide. After one person sues for damage to his/her car and personal injuries, the defendant counterclaims for similar property damage and personal injury claims.

== United States ==
In U.S. federal courts, counterclaims can arise on various occasions, including e.g.:

- an attempt by the defendant to offset or reduce the amount/implications of the plaintiff's claim;
- a different claim by the defendant against the plaintiff;
- a claim by an impleaded third-party defendant against the original defendant acting as a third-party plaintiff;
- a claim by any party against another party who has made a crossclaim against them

=== Counterclaims v. crossclaims ===
Dependent upon the location of where the lawsuit was originated, the defending party has a period of time to file a countersuit, also known as a counterclaim, against the claiming party. This is a direct claim from the defending party against the party who initiated the lawsuit for concurrent claims, including being wrongfully sued.

A crossclaim is a pleading made against a party who is a co-defendant or co-plaintiff. A crossclaim is against anyone who is "on the same side of the lawsuit". An example of this is a manufacturing company who ships their product through a third-party transportation company to the buyer. Upon the products being inspected by the buyer, the buyer finds that the product has been damaged in shipping and refuses to pay. If the manufacturer sued the buyer, the buyer would serve an answer with a denial that the buyer owed money to the manufacturer and a crossclaim to the shipping company to compensate for the damages.

=== Compulsory v. permissive ===
Under the Federal Rules of Civil Procedure (FRCP), counterclaims are either compulsory or permissive.

Permissive counterclaims comprise "any claim that is not compulsory." Such claims may be brought, but no rights are waived if they are not. Courts rarely give permissive counterclaims the necessary supplemental jurisdiction to be brought.

A claim is a compulsory counterclaim if, at the time of serving the pleading,

1. the counterclaim "arises out of the transaction or occurrence that is the subject matter of the opposing party's claim,"
2. AND the counterclaim "does not require adding another party over whom the court cannot acquire jurisdiction,"
3. AND "when the action was commenced, the [otherwise mandatory counterclaim] was [not] the subject of another pending action,"
4. AND

- EITHER the opposing party sued on its claim by a process that established personal jurisdiction over the pleader on that claim, (i.e., NOT by a process such as attachment)
- OR (if personal jurisdiction was not established over the pleader), the pleader asserts some other mandatory counterclaim.

This last (fourth) requirement is explained in the official notes as follows:

When a defendant, if he desires to defend his interest in property, is obliged to come in and litigate in a court to whose jurisdiction he could not ordinarily be subjected, fairness suggests that he should not be required to assert counterclaims, but should rather be permitted to do so at his election. If, however, he does elect to assert a counterclaim, it seems fair to require him to assert any other which is compulsory within the meaning of Rule 13(a). Clause (2), added by amendment to Rule 13(a), carries out this idea. It will apply to various cases described in Rule 4(e), as amended, where service is effected through attachment or other process by which the court does not acquire jurisdiction to render a personal judgment against the defendant. Clause (2) will also apply to State courts jurisdictionally grounded on attachment or the like, and removed to the Federal courts.

— NOTES of Advisory Committee on 1963 amendments to Rules

If the counterclaim is compulsory, it must be brought in the current action or it is waived and lost forever.

Various tests have been proposed for when a counterclaim arises from the same transaction or occurrence, including same issues of fact and law, use of the same evidence, and logical relation between the claims.

== England and Wales ==
Part 20 of the Civil Procedure Rules sets out the rules for making a counterclaim. A defendant can make a counterclaim against the claimant by filing particulars of claim alongside their defence to the claim. If they do not do this, or they wish to make a counterclaim against another party, they must seek permission from the court.

== See also ==
- fr:Demande incidente: about all kinds of claims that don't open a new suit
