= Crossclaim =

US civil court procedural device

A crossclaim is a claim asserted between codefendants or coplaintiffs in a case and that relates to the subject of the original claim or counterclaim according to Black's Law Dictionary. A crossclaim is filed against someone who is a co-defendant or co-plaintiff to the party who originates the crossclaim. In common law, a crossclaim is a demand made in a pleading that is filed against a party which is on the "same side" of the lawsuit.

== U.S. federal courts ==
In the Federal Rules of Civil Procedure this is codified in Rule 13(g). In the federal rules, a crossclaim is proper if it relates to a matter of the original jurisdiction. Proper jurisdiction is determined by a finding of whether the suit that is being initiated arises from the same transaction or occurrence that is the subject matter of the suit.

Crossclaims, like joinder generally, can promote efficient, consistent resolutions of disputes by permitting all claims arising from the same set of facts to be resolved in a single legal proceeding. This conserves the resources of the parties and the courts, by requiring fewer cases to be filed and litigated. It also reduces the risk of inconsistent results that can arise when multiple actions are based on the same or similar facts.

Nevertheless, crossclaims in U.S. federal courts are always permissive; that is, they may be raised if they are proper, but they do not have to be, and the failure to assert a crossclaim in a given action will not bar that claim from being litigated in the future. This is different from counterclaims, which are between parties that are already on opposing sides of the lawsuit. Under some circumstances, counterclaims are compulsory and must be brought in the initial action or else will be forfeited.
