= Judicial Code of 1911 =

- Long title: An Act to codify, revise, and amend the laws relating to the judiciary
- Enacted by: the 61st United States Congress
- Effective: January 1, 1912

Citations
- Statutes at Large: 36 Stat. 1087

Codification
- Acts repealed: Judiciary Act of 1789 (parts)

Legislative history
- Passed the House on; Passed the Senate on; Signed into law by President William Howard Taft on March 3, 1911

The Judicial Code of 1911 (Pub. L. 61–475, 36 Stat. 1087, enacted March 3, 1911) abolished the United States circuit courts and transferred their trial jurisdiction to the U.S. district courts.

In 1911, the United States Congress created a single code encompassing all statutes related to the judiciary and took the opportunity to revise and unify existing laws. At the same time, Congress abolished the U.S. circuit courts as of January 1, 1912, the effective date of the statute. Established by the Judiciary Act of 1789, the circuit courts served as the most important trial courts of the federal judiciary for over a century. The circuit courts lost their limited appellate jurisdiction in the Judiciary Act of 1891, which created the U.S. courts of appeals, but as part of the political compromise behind the 1891 Act, the circuit courts continued to serve as trial courts alongside the district courts for the next 20 years. By abolishing the circuit courts and transferring their jurisdiction and pending business to the district courts, Congress instituted a judicial system with a single type of trial court and eliminated the inefficiencies associated with administering two types of court that were often presided over by the same judge.

The remainder of the Judicial Code of 1911 was not so much a reorganization of the structure or procedures of the federal courts as it was a standardization of law governing the judiciary. Over more than 120 years, many contradictory statutes had accumulated through legislation approved for the purpose of organizing individual courts. Congress had first gathered the statutes related to the judiciary into a single code in the Revised Statutes adopted in 1874, but the resulting Title XIII preserved all of the legislation then in effect without reconciling the varying rules and court structures that often applied to the same types of courts in different parts of the country. In 1899, Congress appointed a commission to recommend revisions in the judicial code, and the subsequent report became the basis of the proposed revision submitted to Congress in March 1910.

The broad reconsideration of judicial statutes encouraged some members of Congress to use the proposed code as a means to enact a substantial reorganization of the courts or to win approval for major legislation indirectly related to the judicial function. Members of the Senate and the House of Representatives offered amendments to restrict the issuance of injunctions in labor disputes, and House members revived the debate over the monetary value required to establish diversity jurisdiction in cases involving parties from different states. They hoped that a $5000 limit, up from $2000, would restrict the ability of corporations to remove cases from the state courts. The House narrowly defeated an amendment that would have sharply limited the ability of a corporation to remove a case regardless of the amount involved. The approved code increased the jurisdictional amount to $3000, but for the most part Congress resisted the suggestions to enact major new legislation through the revised code. The abolition of the circuit courts prompted numerous lesser changes, the most significant of which was the provision authorizing a senior circuit judge or circuit justice to assign a circuit judge to hold a district court "whenever … the public interest shall require."
