= Clearfield =

Clearfield may refer to:

== Places ==
=== Australia ===
- Clearfield, New South Wales

=== United States ===
- Clearfield, Iowa, a city
- Clearfield, Kansas, an unincorporated community
- Clearfield, Kentucky, an unincorporated community
- Clearfield Township, Griggs County, North Dakota, a township
- Clearfield, Pennsylvania, a borough
- Clearfield County, Pennsylvania
- Clearfield Township, Butler County, Pennsylvania
- Clearfield Township, Cambria County, Pennsylvania
- Clearfield, South Dakota, an unincorporated community
- Clearfield Colony, South Dakota, a census-designated place
- Clearfield, Utah, a city
  - Clearfield (UTA station), Utah Transit Authority commuter rail station
- Clearfield, Wisconsin, a town

== People ==
- Andrea Clearfield (born 1960), American composer

== Other uses ==
- USS Clearfield
- Clearfield Farm, historic home in Delaware
- Clearfield Production Systems, a herbicide system marketed by BASF involving imidazolinone herbicides such as imazaquin
- Clearfield Doctrine, a legal principle derived from the US Supreme Court decision in Clearfield Trust Co. v. United States (1943)
