= Boyle v. United Technologies Corp. =

- Supreme Court of the United States

Argued October 13, 1987 Reargued April 27, 1988 Decided June 27, 1988
- Full case name: Boyle v. United Technologies Corporation
- Docket no.: 86-492
- Citations: 487 U.S. 500 (more) 108 S. Ct. 2510; 101 L. Ed. 2d 442; 1988 U.S. LEXIS 2880;
- Argument: Oral argument
- Reargument: Reargument
- Opinion announcement: Opinion announcement

Case history
- Prior: Jury verdict for Boyle (E.D. Va.); Reversed; Boyle v. United Technologies Corp., 792 F.2d 413 (4th Cir. 1986)

Holding
- Government contractors are immune from liability for design defects in military equipment

Court membership
- Chief Justice William Rehnquist Associate Justices William J. Brennan Jr. · Byron White; Thurgood Marshall · Harry Blackmun; John P. Stevens · Sandra Day O'Connor; Antonin Scalia · Anthony Kennedy

Case opinions
- Majority: Scalia, joined by Rehnquist, White, O'Connor, Kennedy
- Dissent: Brennan, joined by Marshall, Blackmun
- Dissent: Stevens

Laws applied
- Federal common law

Boyle v. United Technologies Corp., 487 U.S. 500 (1988), is a United States Supreme Court case in which the Court held that government contractors are immune from liability for design defects in military equipment.

It came from a 1986 decision from the United States Court of Appeals for the Fourth Circuit reversing a jury verdict for Boyle on the grounds that government contractors are immune from liability for design defects in military equipment.

== Background ==
David A. Boyle was a helicopter pilot in the United States Marine Corps. In 1983, his helicopter crashed in a training exercise off the coast of Virginia Beach. Boyle survived the impact but could not escape due to a design flaw that blocked the co-pilot's access to the escape hatch when one of the control sticks was pulled fully up. Boyle's family sued the manufacturer of the helicopter under a theory of common law tort products liability. The jury awarded Boyle's family $725,000.

The Fourth Circuit Court of Appeals reversed the jury award for Boyle, finding as a matter of law that military contractors are immune from liability under the newly-recognized military contractor defense. The Fourth Circuit formulated a four-part defense:

"[a] military contractor can escape liability for a design defect if it can demonstrate that 1) the United States is immune from liability; 2) the United States approved reasonably precise specifications for the equipment; 3) the equipment conformed to those specifications; and 4) the supplier warned the United States about dangers in the use of the equipment that were known to the supplier but not to the United States."

Other Courts of Appeal had adopted similar formulations of the defense. This defense was recognized for the first time in the Fourth Circuit in a separate Fourth Circuit decision released the same day as Boyle, also involving a military training incident. The Fourth Circuit extended immunity to military contractors based on the already-established government contractor defense, which precluded liability when contractors were acting under the direction and authority of the United States.

== Opinion of the Court ==
Justice Antonin Scalia delivered a 5–4 opinion vacating and remanding the Fourth Circuit's decision. Justice Scalia grounded the decision in federal common law, arguing that military contracting is an area of "uniquely federal interest" which requires federal preemption of state tort law. Justice Scalia recounted two other areas of law of "uniquely federal interest." First, contracts involving the United States (citing Clearfield Trust Co. v. United States), and second, civil liability of federal officials for actions taken in the scope of their duty. Like federal officials carrying out their duties, military contractors designing equipment "implicat[es] the same interest in getting the Government's work done." Justice Scalia also noted that increased costs from civil liability will be "passed through, substantially if not totally, to the United States itself. . . ."

Establishing that a "uniquely federal interest" pre-empts state law is a threshold matter. The federal interest in procurement is not by itself enough to automatically displace state rules. For preemption to occur, there must be a tangible and significant conflict between the operation of state law and a clear federal policy objective.

The Court declined to apply the reasoning of the court below because grounding the defense in the Feres doctrine would both overprotect contractors in cases of standard goods and underprotect them in cases involving civilians and critical military design. The Court therefore settled on a different limiting principle to identify "significant conflict" with a federal policy: While the FTCA allows lawsuits against the U.S. for employee negligence, it contains a critical exception for claims based on the "discretionary function" of a federal agency or employee.

The FTCA exemption specifically shields the government from lawsuits over its discretionary policy choices, such as military equipment design choices that balance combat needs against safety. Holding military contractors liable under state tort law for following government design specifications would frustrate the clear purpose of this federal law. Therefore, state laws that impose liability on contractors for design defects in military equipment do create a "significant conflict" with federal policy.

The Court settled on a three-part test to determine whether a defendant is entitled to military contractor liability.

"(1) the United States approved reasonably precise specifications; (2) the equipment conformed to those specifications; and (3) the supplier warned the United States about the dangers in the use of the equipment that were known to the supplier but not to the United States."

Because the Fourth Circuit's decision was unclear whether a reasonable jury could have found for Boyle under the properly formulated defense, the Court vacated the judgment and remanded to the Fourth Circuit.

=== Brennan's dissent ===
Justice William Brennan authored a dissenting opinion. The dissent strongly criticized the majority's opinion for judicial policymaking and stretching precedent.

Government contractor liability was first established in Yearsley v. W.A. Ross Construction, involving suits against a private contractor following the erosion of a dam it built for the government. Brennan emphasized that Yearsley involved the takings clause and that the plaintiffs still had a cause of action against the government. Brennan also emphasized that in Yearsley, the contractor was "following, not formulating, the Government's specifications."

Brennan also criticized the majority's use of the Federal Tort Claims Act's "discretionary function" exception to justify the military contractor immunity doctrine. In United States v. Gilman the court held that the Federal Tort Claims Act does not contain an implied right of indemnity for the United States even where the financial burden would be significant.

Brennan also argued the majority's standard would allow "perhaps no more than a rubber stamp from a federal procurement officer who might or might not have noticed or cared about the defects, or even had the expertise to discover them."

=== Stevens' dissent ===
Justice Stevens wrote a separate dissent to criticize the majority's decision as judicial policymaking.

== Impact ==
The decision has been widely criticized by scholars and academics. Many academics noted the inconsistency between Boyle and textualism, a method of interpretation championed by Justice Scalia.
