= Mill Green Historic District =

Historic district in Maryland, United States

- U.S. National Register of Historic Places
- U.S. Historic district
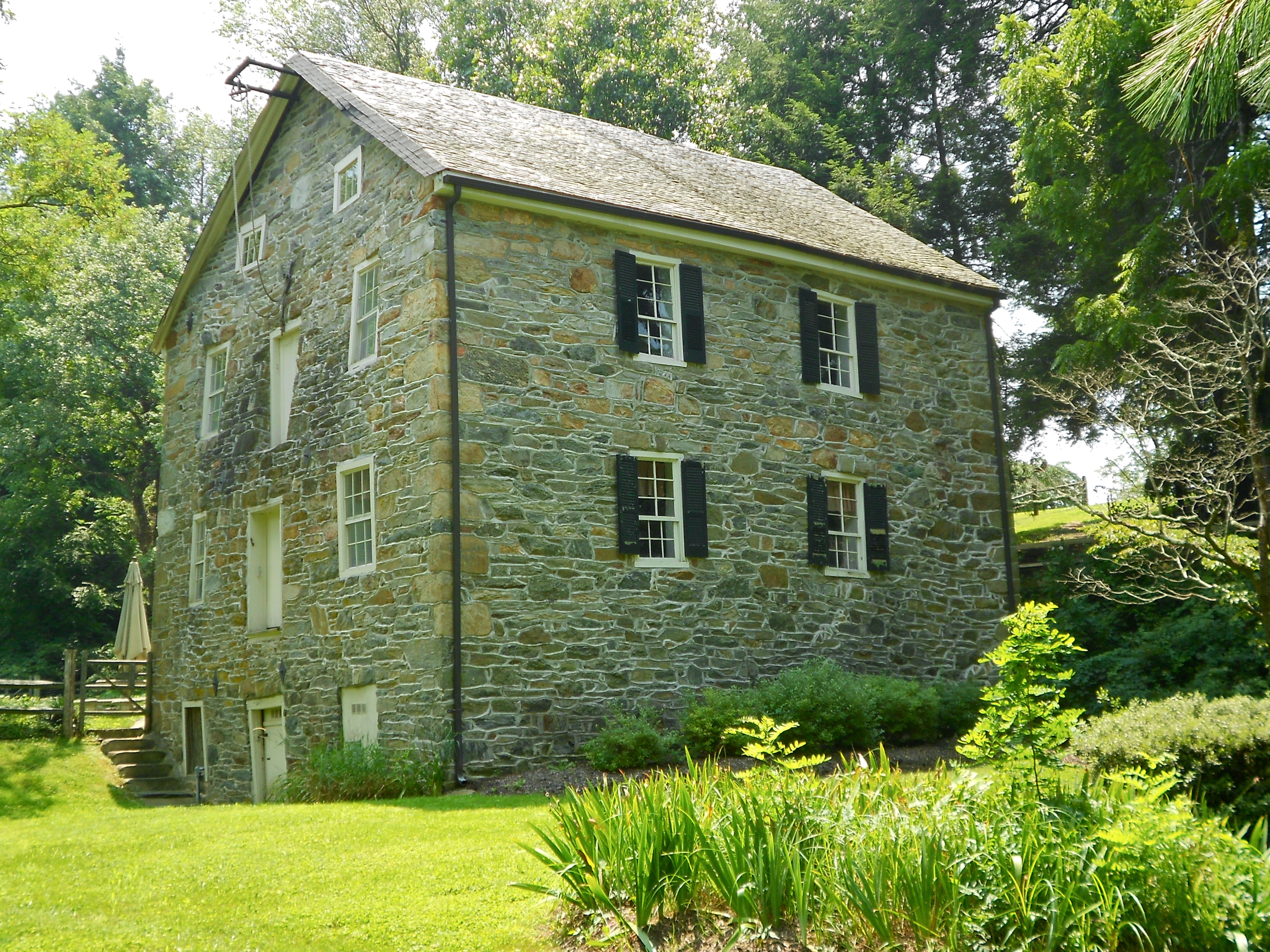
- Old mill building in Mill Green Green Historic District in 2013

- Location within Maryland Location within the United States
- Location: Junction of Mill Green and Prospect Rds., Street, Maryland
- Coordinates: 39°39′50″N 76°19′34″W
- Area: 110 acres (45 ha)
- Built: 1770
- Architectural style: Late Victorian, Federal
- NRHP reference No.: 93000445
- Added to NRHP: June 3, 1993

The Mill Green Historic District is a National Register of Historic Places listed community located in Harford County, Maryland. The district consists of a small cluster of privately owned historic homes and buildings including a historic mill. The district is located at the junction of Mill Green Road and Prospect Road. Broad Creek flows through the district. The historic district designation was established in 1993.

== History ==
Before the Revolutionary War, around 1770, William Ashmore built a house and mill in the area, which was inherited by his son John Ashmore in 1798. At that time, he owned 1,208 acres and five slaves. The area was initially known as Ashmore's Mill. The mill generated wheat flour, which was generally sold in Baltimore. The mill led to the expansion of the area into a 100-acre village with a general store, post office, saw mill, a cider mill, and an undertaker. The businesses, generally combined within the owners' residences, served Mill Green and area farmers. In 1801, a road was built that led to the county seat in Bel Air and north towards York County, Pennsylvania. John's daughter, Susanna married Nathan Bemis. The couple was deeded 1,600 acres in land by John and Margaret Ashmore in 1821. An arrangement was established between Nathan and Susanna Bemis and the Ashmores in which the Ashmores lived in the original stone house, received a $10,000 bond, and received enough meat, produce and other food for three people. They also had a horse and two cows.

Built in a distant and rural area, it became a self-sufficient community into the 19th century, with the establishment of a doctor's home and office, purchase of vacant land by farmers, and settlement of additional skilled tradesmen. Nathan Bemis, replaced the original mill with a new 3 1/2 story mill in 1827. No longer needed, the sawmill closed about 1933. The miller's house, the original house built by William Ashmore, was made a lodging. In the mid-20th century, a new road was built west of the village which led to Dublin and Darlington, Maryland and up to Susquehanna and Tidewater Canal at Havre de Grace. The post office was later moved to Street, Maryland.

The buildings in the district include the Mill Green Mill and Mill Race (ca. 1827), Miller's House (ca. 1770), William G. Roberts House (ca. 1866), Biles House / Mill Green Hotel (ca. 1852), Biles Tenant House (ca. 1852), Treakle House (ca. 1873), Robinson-Huff-Famous House (ca. mid 19th century), Huff / Famous Tenant House (ca. third quarter of the 19th century), Mill Green Store and Post Office (ca. 1850), and Dr. William E. Arthur House (ca. 1898).

== Prigg v. Pennsylvania ==
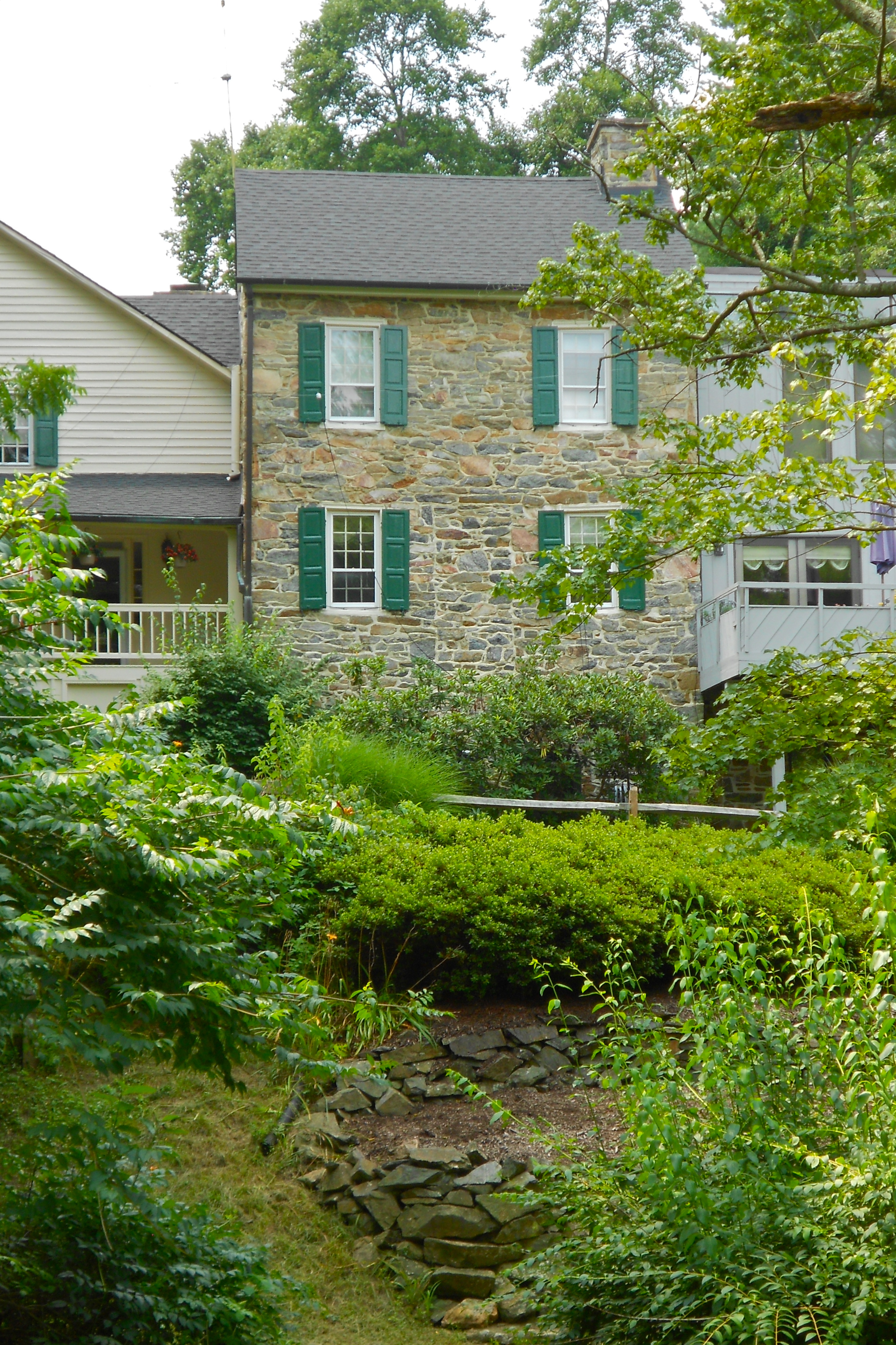
Stone house on the ridge above the mill

John Ashmore's widow, Margaret, and Natham Bemis became embroiled in what the Pennsylvania courts saw as a kidnapping and the Maryland courts saw as a lifetime enslavement of Margaret Morgan by John Ashmore's heirs. The case was heard in county, state and ultimately the Supreme Court of the United States case Prigg v. Pennsylvania. Margaret Morgan may have been enslaved as a girl and young woman, but she and her parents were not included in the 1824 inventory of John Ashmore's property for the adjudicating the estate of Ashmore following his death in 1823.
