= List of acts of the Parliament of Australia from 1906 =

This is a list of acts of the Parliament of Australia for the year 1906.

== 1906 ==
Short title, or popular name	Citation	Royal assent
Long title
Supply Act (No. 1) 1906-7 (repealed)	No. 1 of 1906	28 June 1906
An Act to grant and apply out of the Consolidated Revenue Fund a sum for the service of the year ending the thirtieth day of June One thousand nine hundred and seven.
Governor-General's Residences Act 1906 (repealed)	No. 2 of 1906	8 August 1906
An Act Relating to the Residences of the Governor-General.
Meteorology Act 1906 (repealed)	No. 3 of 1906	28 August 1906
An Act relating to Meteorological Observations.
Designs Act 1906 (repealed)	No. 4 of 1906	28 August 1906
An Act relating to Copyright in Industrial Designs.
Judiciary Act 1906 (repealed)	No. 5 of 1906	28 August 1906
An Act to amend the Judiciary Act 1903. (Note: Judiciary Act 1903 (No. 6))
Supply Act (No. 2) 1906-7 (repealed)	No. 6 of 1906	
Appropriation (Works and Buildings) Act 1906-7 (repealed)	No. 7 of 1906	
Audit Act 1906	No. 8 of 1906	24 September 1906
An Act to amend the Audit Act 1901. (Note: Audit Act 1901 (No. 4))
Australian Industries Preservation Act 1906 (repealed)	No. 9 of 1906	24 September 1906
An Act for the Preservation of Australian Industries, and for the depression of Destructive Monopolies.
Tasmanian Cable Rates Act 1906 (repealed)	No. 10 of 1906	28 September 1906
An Act to amend the Post and Telegraph Rates Act 1902.
Referendum (Constitution Alteration) Act 1906 (repealed)	No. 11 of 1906	8 October 1906
An Act relating to the submission to the Electors of proposed Laws for the alteration of the Constitution.
Electoral Validating Act 1906 (repealed)	No. 12 of 1906	
Lands Acquisition Act 1906 (repealed)	No. 13 of 1906	12 October 1906
An Act relating to the Acquisition by the Commonwealth of Land required for Public Purposes and for dealing with Land so acquired and for other purposes connected therewith.
Customs Tariff 1906 (repealed)	No. 14 of 1906	12 October 1906
Excise Tariff (Amendment) 1906 (repealed)	No. 15 of 1906	12 October 1906
Excise Tariff 1906 (Note: Two acts of 1906, No. 16 and No. 20, were both assigned the same short-title, Excise Tariff 1906.) (repealed)	No. 16 of 1906	12 October 1906
An Act relating to Duties of Excise.
Customs Tariff (South African Preference) 1906 (repealed)	No. 17 of 1906	
Commonwealth Electoral Act 1906 (repealed)	No. 18 of 1906	
Patents Act 1906 (repealed)	No. 19 of 1906	
Excise Tariff 1906 (repealed)	No. 20 of 1906	12 October 1906
An Act to amend the Excise Tariff 1902. (Note: Excise Tariff 1902 (No. 11))
Spirits Act 1906 (repealed)	No. 21 of 1906	12 October 1906
Pacific Island Labourers Act 1906 (repealed)	No. 22 of 1906	12 October 1906
An Act to amend the Pacific Island Labourers Act 1901. (Note: Pacific Island Labourers Act 1901 (No. 16))
Appropriation Act 1906-7 (repealed)	No. 23 of 1906	12 October 1906
An Act to grant and apply a sum out of the Consolidated Revenue Fund to the service of the year ending the thirtieth day of June One thousand nine hundred and seven and to appropriate the supplies granted for such year in this session of the Parliament.

== Sources ==
- "legislation.gov.au".
