= List of United States Supreme Court cases, volume 41 =

Supreme Court of the United States
- Interactive map of Supreme Court of the United States
- 38°53′26″N 77°00′16″W
- Established: March 4, 1789; 236 years ago
- Location: Washington, D.C.
- Coordinates: 38°53′26″N 77°00′16″W
- Composition method: Presidential nomination with Senate confirmation
- Authorised by: Constitution of the United States, Art. III, § 1
- Judge term length: life tenure, subject to impeachment and removal
- Number of positions: 9 (by statute)
- Website: supremecourt.gov

This is a list of cases reported in volume 41 (16 Pet.) of United States Reports, decided by the Supreme Court of the United States in 1842.

== Nominative reports ==
In 1874, the U.S. government created the United States Reports, and retroactively numbered older privately-published case reports as part of the new series. As a result, cases appearing in volumes 1–90 of U.S. Reports have dual citation forms; one for the volume number of U.S. Reports, and one for the volume number of the reports named for the relevant reporter of decisions (these are called "nominative reports").

=== Richard Peters, Jr. ===
Starting with the 26th volume of U.S. Reports, the Reporter of Decisions of the Supreme Court of the United States was Richard Peters, Jr. Peters was Reporter of Decisions from 1828 to 1843, covering volumes 26 through 41 of United States Reports which correspond to volumes 1 through 16 of his Peters's Reports. As such, the dual form of citation to, for example, Nixdorff v. Smith is 41 U.S. (16 Pet.) 132 (1842).

== Justices of the Supreme Court at the time of 41 U.S. (16 Pet.) ==
The Supreme Court is established by Article III, Section 1 of the Constitution of the United States, which says: "The judicial Power of the United States, shall be vested in one supreme Court . . .". The size of the Court is not specified; the Constitution leaves it to Congress to set the number of justices. Under the Judiciary Act of 1789 Congress originally fixed the number of justices at six (one chief justice and five associate justices). Since 1789 Congress has varied the size of the Court from six to seven, nine, ten, and back to nine justices (always including one chief justice).

When the cases in 41 U.S. (16 Pet.) were decided the Court comprised these nine justices:

Portrait	Justice	Office	Home State	Succeeded	Date confirmed by the Senate (Vote)	Tenure on Supreme Court
	Roger B. Taney	Chief Justice	Maryland	John Marshall	March 15, 1836 (29–15)	March 28, 1836 – October 12, 1864 (Died)
	Joseph Story	Associate Justice	Massachusetts	William Cushing	November 18, 1811 (Acclamation)	February 3, 1812 – September 10, 1845 (Died)
	Smith Thompson	Associate Justice	New York	Henry Brockholst Livingston	December 9, 1823 (Acclamation)	September 1, 1823 – December 18, 1843 (Died)
	John McLean	Associate Justice	Ohio	Robert Trimble	March 7, 1829 (Acclamation)	January 11, 1830 – April 4, 1861 (Died)
	Henry Baldwin	Associate Justice	Pennsylvania	Bushrod Washington	January 6, 1830 (41–2)	January 18, 1830 – April 21, 1844 (Died)
	James Moore Wayne	Associate Justice	Georgia	William Johnson	January 9, 1835 (Acclamation)	January 14, 1835 – July 5, 1867 (Died)
	John Catron	Associate Justice	Tennessee	newly created seat	March 8, 1837 (28–15)	May 1, 1837 – May 30, 1865 (Died)
	John McKinley	Associate Justice	Alabama	newly created seat	September 25, 1837 (Acclamation)	January 9, 1838 – July 19, 1852 (Died)
	Peter Vivian Daniel	Associate Justice	Virginia	Philip P. Barbour	March 2, 1841 (25–5)	January 10, 1842 – May 31, 1860 (Died)

== Notable Cases in 41 U.S. (16 Pet.) ==
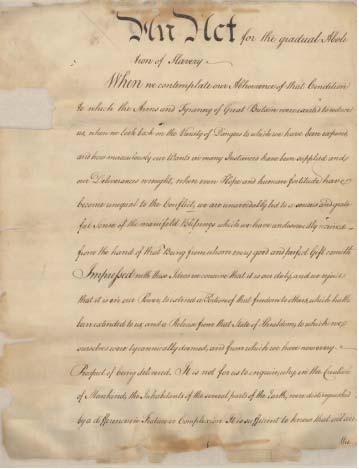
Pennsylvania Act for the Gradual Abolition of Slavery (1780)

=== Swift v. Tyson ===
In Swift v. Tyson, 41 U.S. (16 Pet.) 1 (1842), the US Supreme Court determined that United States federal courts hearing diversity jurisdiction cases under the Judiciary Act of 1789 must apply statutory state laws when the state legislature in question had spoken on the relevant issue, but need not apply the a state's common law if the state's legislature had not spoken on the issue. The decision meant that the federal courts deciding matters not specifically addressed by a state legislature had the authority to develop a federal common law.

=== Prigg v. Pennsylvania ===
In Prigg v. Pennsylvania, 41 U.S. (16 Pet.) 539 (1842), the US Supreme Court held that the federal Fugitive Slave Act of 1793 pre-empted a state law that made it a crime to take blacks out of the free state of Pennsylvania and into slavery elsewhere. Also, by refusing to take judicial notice of the problem of free blacks being kidnapped in free states and sold into slavery, Prigg implied that blacks were entitled to fewer procedural protections than were whites.

== Citation style ==
Under the Judiciary Act of 1789 the federal court structure at the time comprised District Courts, which had general trial jurisdiction; Circuit Courts, which had mixed trial and appellate (from the US District Courts) jurisdiction; and the United States Supreme Court, which had appellate jurisdiction over the federal District and Circuit courts—and for certain issues over state courts. The Supreme Court also had limited original jurisdiction (i.e., in which cases could be filed directly with the Supreme Court without first having been heard by a lower federal or state court). There were one or more federal District Courts and/or Circuit Courts in each state, territory, or other geographical region.

Bluebook citation style is used for case names, citations, and jurisdictions.

- "C.C.D." = United States Circuit Court for the District of . . .
  - e.g.,"C.C.D.N.J." = United States Circuit Court for the District of New Jersey
- "D." = United States District Court for the District of . . .
  - e.g.,"D. Mass." = United States District Court for the District of Massachusetts
- "E." = Eastern; "M." = Middle; "N." = Northern; "S." = Southern; "W." = Western
  - e.g.,"C.C.S.D.N.Y." = United States Circuit Court for the Southern District of New York
  - e.g.,"M.D. Ala." = United States District Court for the Middle District of Alabama
- "Ct. Cl." = United States Court of Claims
- The abbreviation of a state's name alone indicates the highest appellate court in that state's judiciary at the time.
  - e.g.,"Pa." = Supreme Court of Pennsylvania
  - e.g.,"Me." = Supreme Judicial Court of Maine

== List of cases in 41 U.S. (16 Pet.) ==
Case Name	Page and year	Opinion of the Court	Concurring opinion(s)	Dissenting opinion(s)	Lower Court	Disposition
Swift v. Tyson	1 (1842)	Story	Catron	none	C.C.S.D.N.Y.	certification
Watkins v. Holman's Lessee	25 (1842)	McLean	none	none	C.C.S.D. Ala.	reversed
Beall v. Holman's Lessee	64 (1842)	per curiam	none	none	C.C.N.D. Ala.	reversed
Long v. Palmer, Smith and Company	65 (1842)	Thompson	none	none	C.C.S.D. Miss.	affirmed
Cocke ex rel. Commercial Bank v. Halsey	71 (1842)	Daniel	none	none	C.C.S.D. Miss.	reversed
Keary v. Farmers' and Merchants' Bank of Memphis	89 (1842)	Story	none	none	C.C.S.D. Miss.	reversed
Gordon v. Longest	97 (1842)	McLean	none	none	Ky.	reversed
Tompkins v. Wheeler	106 (1842)	Thompson	none	none	C.C.D. Ky.	affirmed
Brander v. Phillips and Company	121 (1842)	McLean	none	none	C.C.S.D. Ala.	affirmed
Nixdorff v. Smith	132 (1842)	McKinley	none	none	C.C.D.C.	reversed
Randolph v. Barrett	138 (1842)	McKinley	none	none	C.C.S.D. Miss.	affirmed
United States v. Breward	143 (1842)	Catron	none	none	Fla. Super. Ct.	certification
Fulton v. McAffee	149 (1842)	Taney	none	none	Miss.	dismissed
United States v. Miranda	153 (1842)	Wayne	none	none	Fla. Super. Ct.	reversed
United States v. Low	162 (1842)	Catron	none	none	Fla. Super. Ct.	affirmed
Hyde and Gleises v. Booraem and Company	169 (1842)	Story	none	none	C.C.E.D. La.	reversed
Hobson v. McArthur's Heirs	182 (1842)	Thompson	none	none	C.C.D. Ohio	reversed
United States v. Hanson	196 (1842)	Catron	none	none	Fla. Super. Ct.	reversed
United States v. Murphy	203 (1842)	Story	none	none	C.C.S.D.N.Y.	certification
Hozey v. Buchanan	215 (1842)	McLean	none	none	E.D. La.	reversed
Milnor v. Metz	221 (1842)	Catron	none	none	C.C.D.C.	affirmed
United States v. Clarke's Heirs	228 (1842)	Catron	none	none	Fla. Super. Ct.	affirmed
City of Mobile v. Eslava	234 (1842)	McLean	Catron	none	Ala.	affirmed
City of Mobile v. Hallett	261 (1842)	McLean	none	Catron	Ala.	affirmed
Kelsey v. Hobby	269 (1842)	Taney	none	none	C.C.D.S.C.	affirmed
Armstrong v. Athens County	281 (1842)	Catron	none	none	Ohio	affirmed
United States v. Eliason	291 (1842)	Daniel	none	none	C.C.D.C.	reversed
Amis v. Smith	303 (1842)	McKinley	none	none	N.D. Miss.	affirmed
Gibson v. Chew	315 (1842)	Wayne	none	none	C.C.S.D. Miss.	reversed
Bradstreet v. Potter	317 (1842)	Wayne	none	none	C.C.N.D.N.Y.	reversed
Roach v. Hulings	319 (1842)	Daniel	none	none	C.C.D.C.	affirmed
Fresh v. Gilson	327 (1842)	Daniel	none	none	C.C.D.C.	reversed
Prouty v. Ruggles	336 (1842)	Taney	none	none	C.C.D. Mass.	affirmed
Wood v. United States	342 (1842)	Story	none	none	C.C.D. Md.	affirmed
Martin v. Waddell's Lessee	367 (1842)	Taney	none	Thompson	C.C.D.N.J.	reversed
Dobbins v. Erie County	435 (1842)	Wayne	none	none	Pa.	reversed
Parish v. Ellis	451 (1842)	Taney	none	none	Ct. App. Terr. Fla.	dismissed
Harpending v. Reformed Protestant Church of New York	455 (1842)	Catron	none	none	C.C.S.D.N.Y.	affirmed
Carpenter v. Providence Washington Insurance Company	495 (1842)	Story	none	none	C.C.D.R.I.	affirmed
Carver v. Hyde	513 (1842)	Taney	none	none	C.C.D. Mass.	affirmed
Todd v. Daniel	521 (1842)	Story	none	none	C.C.D. Me.	multiple
Mills v. Brown	525 (1842)	Taney	none	none	Ill.	dismissed
Mauran v. Bullus	528 (1842)	McLean	none	none	C.C.D.R.I.	affirmed
Prigg v. Pennsylvania	539 (1842)	Story	Taney; Thompson; Wayne; Daniel	McLean	Pa.	reversed

== See also ==
- Certificate of division
