= Clearfield Trust Co. v. United States =

- Supreme Court of the United States

Argued February 5, 1943 Decided March 1, 1943
- Full case name: Clearfield Trust Company, et al. v. United States
- Citations: 318 U.S. 363 (more) 63 S. Ct. 573; 87 L. Ed. 838; 1943 U.S. LEXIS 1298

Case history
- Prior: On writ of certiorari from the United States Court of Appeals for the Third Circuit

Holding
- Federal negotiable instruments are governed by federal law, therefore the federal court has the authority to fashion a federal common law rule.

Court membership
- Chief Justice Harlan F. Stone Associate Justices Owen Roberts · Hugo Black; Stanley F. Reed · Felix Frankfurter; William O. Douglas · Frank Murphy; Robert H. Jackson · Wiley B. Rutledge

Case opinion
- Majority: Douglas, joined by unanimous
- Justices Murphy and Rutledge took no part in the consideration or decision of the case.

Clearfield Trust Co. v. United States, 318 U.S. 363 (1943), was a case in which the Supreme Court of the United States held that federal negotiable instruments were governed by federal law, and thus the federal court had the authority to fashion a common law rule.

== Facts and procedural history ==
On April 28, 1936, the Federal Reserve Bank of Philadelphia mailed a check for $24.20, drawn on the Treasurer of the United States, to Clair Barner. The check was Barner's paycheck from the Works Progress Administration (WPA). Barner never received the check, which was stolen by an unknown party. The thief forged Barner's signature and cashed the check at the J.C. Penney department store in Clearfield, Pennsylvania, where the thief assumed the identity of Mr. Barner. J.C. Penney then turned the check over to Clearfield Trust Co. as its collection agent. Clearfield Trust Co. collected the check from the Federal Reserve Bank, knowing nothing about the forgery.

On May 10, 1936, Barner informed his supervisors at the WPA that he had not received his paycheck. His complaint made its way up the chain of command, and on November 30, 1936, Barner signed an affidavit alleging that the endorsement of his name on the check was forged. Neither J.C. Penney Co. nor Clearfield Trust Co. had any notice of the forgery until January 12, 1937, when the U.S. government sent its first notice about it. The United States sent its initial request for reimbursement on August 31, 1937, and filed suit against Clearfield Trust Co. in the United States District Court for the Western District of Pennsylvania on November 16, 1939. The government based its cause of action on the express guaranty of prior endorsements by Clearfield Trust Co.

The District Court determined that the dispute should be governed by the state law of Pennsylvania. It then dismissed the government's complaint on grounds of laches, holding that because the United States unreasonably delayed in notifying Clearfield Trust Co. of the forgery, it was barred from recovery. The United States Court of Appeals for the Third Circuit reversed the dismissal.

== Decision ==
Justice Douglas, writing for a unanimous United States Supreme Court, first distinguished the case from Erie Railroad Co. v. Tompkins, holding that because the U.S. government was exercising a constitutionally-permitted function in disbursing its own funds and paying its debts, the commercial paper it issues should be governed by federal law rather than state law. Thus, the Erie doctrine rule—that a United States District Court must apply the law of the state in which it is sitting—did not apply. In the absence of an applicable Act of Congress, a federal court had the right to fashion a governing common law rule by its own standards.

While the Court's decision explicitly retained the option of applying state law in fashioning a federal common law rule, the Court chose instead to fashion its own rule based on prior decisions. Justice Douglas identified a major federal interest in permitting the Court to fashion its own rule: uniformity in dealing with the vast amount of negotiable instruments and commercial paper issued by the federal government. Douglas reasoned that if each transaction were subject to the application of a multiplicity of different state laws, confusion and uncertainty in the administration of federal programs would be the result.

Justice Douglas chose to follow the rule set forth in United States v. National Exchange Bank of Providence, 214 U.S. 302 (1909), in which the U.S. Supreme Court held that the U.S. government, “as drawee of commercial paper stands in no different light than any other drawee” and could recover on a check as a drawee from a person who had cashed a pension check with a forged endorsement, despite the government's protracted delay in giving notice of the forgery. The National Exchange Bank case held the government to conventional business terms, but said nothing about whether lack of prompt notice was a defense for nonpayment of a check. The Court held that the Pennsylvania state law—requiring prompt notice from the drawee—presumed injury to the defendant by the mere fact of delay. In this case, not only did Clearfield Trust Co. fail to demonstrate that it had suffered a loss because of the delay in notice, it could still recover the amount of the check from J.C. Penney, because none of its employees detected the fraud. The court chastised both companies for their "neglect and error" in accepting the forged check, and suggested that they should only be permitted to shift the loss to the drawee only when he can demonstrate that the delay in notice caused him damage.

== See also ==
- List of United States Supreme Court cases, volume 318
