= Rules of Decision Act =

The Rules of Decision Act mandates the application of substantive state law in cases heard in U.S. federal courts sitting in diversity, except where state law is preempted by federal law. The U.S. Supreme Court in Swift v. Tyson (1842) originally read this Act of Congress as limited to state statutory law, but later overturned Swift in Erie Railroad Co. v. Tompkins (1938) and instead held that the Rules of Decision Act requires the application of state law including case law originating from state courts.

The Act originated as Section 34 of the Judiciary Act of 1789. It is now codified, in slightly different form, in 28 U.S.C. § 1652, as follows:

The laws of the several states, except where the Constitution or treaties of the United States or Acts of Congress otherwise require or provide, shall be regarded as rules of decision in civil actions in the courts of the United States, in cases where they apply.

The interpretation of this language, especially the meaning of the phrase "the laws of the several states", was the central issue in Erie Railroad Co. v. Tompkins.

== Foreign influence ==
The Australian Judiciary Act 1903 borrowed verbiage from the Rules of Decision Act.

== See also ==
- Conflict of laws
