= Erie doctrine =

Doctrine in US federal civil procedure

The Erie doctrine is a fundamental principle of civil procedure in the United States that requires federal courts to apply state substantive law in disputes that do not directly involve a federal question. This most commonly occurs when a federal court is exercising diversity jurisdiction, where the United States federal courts hear a case that is not a federal question. It also applies when supplemental jurisdiction is used for claims related to a federal question, or during an adversary proceeding in bankruptcy. Supplemental jurisdiction refers to federal courts hearing additional claims that it otherwise would not have jurisdiction over.

The doctrine follows from the Supreme Court landmark decision in Erie Railroad Co. v. Tompkins (1938). The case overturned Swift v. Tyson, which allowed federal judges sitting in a state to ignore the common law local decisions of state courts in the same state in diversity actions. It permitted federal courts to enforce a federal law instead of state law when the issue had not been previously addressed.

== Application and the "Erie Guess" ==
There are two main objectives of the Erie decision: (1) to discourage forum shopping among litigants, and (2) to avoid inequitable administration of the laws. Broadly speaking, the second objective is sometimes referred to as "vertical uniformity" and is rooted in the idea that in a given state, the outcome of the litigation should not be grossly different just because a litigant filed a claim in a state court rather than a federal court or vice versa.

The Erie doctrine today applies regardless of how the federal court may hear a state claim. Whether the federal court encounters a state law issue in diversity jurisdiction, supplemental jurisdiction, or bankruptcy jurisdiction, the federal court must honor state common law when deciding state law issues. In effect, when the U.S. Constitution does not control and Congress has not legislated (or cannot legislate) on a topic, then the laws of the states necessarily govern and state judge-made rules are equally binding on the federal courts as state statutes.

The federal court must determine if either 1) state law is clear as to the case in controversy, or 2) if not, then has the state's highest court ruled specifically on a similar case. If so, the state law or court ruling must be followed. If not, then the federal court must determine how the state's highest court would potentially rule on a matter. For example, it may look to state appellate courts to see how they ruled, and if the state chose not to hear further appeals, the federal court can determine that the high court agreed with the appellate courts. The determination is called an "'Erie guess". An “Erie guess” allows the federal court to assume the state’s highest court’s decision if it were given the same issue.

Alternatively though, the court may elect to certify the question to the state's highest court for a ruling on state law in the matter. Some states, however, do not allow Federal District Courts to certify questions, only the Supreme Court or Federal Circuit Courts of Appeals.

== Before Erie ==
The Erie case involved a fundamental question of federalism and the jurisdiction of federal courts in the United States. In 1789, the Congress passed a law still in effect today called the Rules of Decision Act (28 U.S.C. § 1652), which states that the laws of a state furnish the rules of decision for a federal court sitting in that state. Thus, a federal court in Texas, hearing a case based on diversity (as opposed to a federal question), has to follow the laws of the applicable state in resolving a case before it.

=== Swift v. Tyson ===
The Supreme Court's decision in Swift v. Tyson had defined the laws of the state as meaning only laws passed by legislatures of that state (though Justice Joseph Story writing for the court suggested that federal courts should pay special attention to how the "local tribunals" of a state would resolve a dispute). Thus, on issues of "general common law", a federal court was free to ignore decisions by a state's highest court.

=== Aftermath of Swift ===
The decision in Swift resulted in inconsistent judicial rulings in the same state on the same legal issue depending on whether a plaintiff brought a case in state or federal court. In one case, for example, Black and White Taxicab Co. v. Brown and Yellow Taxicab Co. 276 U.S. 518 (1928), the Brown and Yellow Cab Company, a Kentucky corporation, sought to create a business association with the Louisville and Nashville Railroad, where Brown and Yellow would have a monopoly on soliciting passengers of the railroad, effectively eliminating the competition, the Black and White Cab Co. Such an agreement was illegal under Kentucky common law, as interpreted by Kentucky's highest court. Brown and Yellow dissolved itself, reincorporated in Tennessee, and executed the agreement there, where such an agreement was legal, bringing suit against Black and White in a Kentucky federal court to prevent them from soliciting passengers. The federal court upheld the agreement, citing Swift, and arguing that under general federal common law, the agreement was valid. If Brown and Yellow had brought suit in a Kentucky state court, the agreement would not have been upheld.

== Erie Railroad v. Tompkins (1938) ==
The Erie decision originated as a dispute between Erie Railroad Company and the plaintiff, Tompkins. Tompkins, was walking alongside Erie's railroad tracks in Pennsylvania when a train passed. An open door struck him and knocked him under the train, severing his arm. In most states, Tompkins could sue for negligence of the railroad and recover monetary damages for his loss. In Pennsylvania, however, Tompkins was considered a trespasser. He could not recover damages for an ordinary negligence claim in the state court of Pennsylvania, because under the law of that state, a claimant had to show "wanton" negligence on part of the Defendant to recover.

Thus, Tompkins brought his case in federal court to avoid the unfavorable state law. The railroad company was based in New York, not Pennsylvania, allowing Tompkins to present the suit to the U.S District Court for the Southern District of New York through the diversity jurisdiction. There, the jury was advised on a rule where it is the railroad’s responsibility to provide a path along its tracks. Tompkins won and received $30,000. The Erie Railroad appealed the decision but the Second Circuit upheld the verdict. The Erie Railroad Co. then sought certiorari from the Supreme Court of the United States.

On April 25, 1938, the court ruled 6-2 in favor of the Erie Railroad, reversing the order issued by the court of appeals. The majority opinion affirmed the ruling should have been based on Pennsylvania state law, rather than common law, and ultimately overturned the precedent set in Swift v. Tyson.

Justice Brandeis justified the opinion of the Court, stating and arguing that the federal courts do not have the power to issue substantive rules of common law on a State. Brandeis upheld that applying state law would yield predictable and uniform results, irrespective of the venue of the trial court. The Court determined that in cases involving diversity jurisdiction, federal procedural law and state substantive law must be applied, when a conflict between the two is absent. Justices Pierce Butler and Clark McReynolds dissented, with Butler arguing that the defendant and litigant did not raise an issue with it and the Court made its decision on inappropriate grounds.

The Court dismantled the dual-track legal system that had allowed identical cases to reach opposite results based solely on the courthouse's front door. This pivot redefined the relationship between state and federal judiciaries, ensuring that federal courts act as an alternative forum for litigation rather than a source of independent substantive law.

== Development ==
Several later cases have added to the vague Erie decision (Brandeis cited no provision of the Constitution that Swift violated, although theoretically it might have violated the Tenth Amendment's reservation of powers to the state). Speaking generally, there are two approaches in determining whether a federal court will apply a state law: (1) the Hanna & Rules Enabling Act approach, per 28 U.S.C. § 2072 when there is a Federal Rule of Civil Procedure and statute that conflicts with a state law; and (2) the Byrd-Erie approach when there is not a conflict between a state and federal practice.

=== Byrd v. Blue Ridge Rural Electrical Cooperative, Inc. (1958) ===
Numerous cases after Erie Railroad Co. v. Tompkins refined the Erie doctrine. For example, Byrd v. Blue Ridge Rural Electrical Cooperative Inc. (1958) established that in diversity cases, federal courts should follow state substantive law but are not bound by state procedural rules that conflict with federal practices. In Byrd, the Court decided that the federal policy allocating responsibilities between judge and jury, as embodied in the 7th Amendment of the US Constitution, outweighed the state rule requiring a judge to decide whether an employer was immune from suit.

=== Hanna v. Plumer (1965) ===
Following a car accident in South Carolina, Ohio resident Hanna sued Massachusetts resident Plumer and the case was heard by Massachusetts federal court under the diversity jurisdiction. The dispute emerged with how Plumer was informed of the lawsuit. Hanna’s team served the legal papers by leaving them with Plumer’s wife, which was acceptable under the Federal Rules of Civil Procedure. However, Massachusetts law required legal papers to be directly hand-delivered to the defendant.

Plumer sought summary judgement at trial as a result. Plumer argued that if the court followed the federal rule, the case would move forward. If it followed state rule, the case would be dismissed. Since the choice of rule would completely change the result of the litigation, Plumer maintained the state's requirement was substantive and should be upheld, meaning the dismissal should stand.

The Court disagreed and ruled unanimously for Hanna. The Court also enforced a limitation to the Erie Doctrine in which though federal courts are to apply state substance law, a Federal Rule of Civil Procedure may still be valid if it directly clashes with the state’s procedural rule. The Erie Doctrine is therefore only triggered if a procedural rule expands, or limits a person’s underlying legal rights. The hand-delivery requirement did not change the substantive law, as the plaintiff could refile or personally serve the defendant. When a rule could be viewed as either substantive or procedural, federal courts maintain the right to follow their own internal procedures.

Under the approach in Hanna v. Plumer, the federal court of a state hearing a case based on diversity jurisdiction should apply state law in the event of conflict between state and federal law, or in the absence of relevant federal positive law, if the state law deals with substantive rights of state citizens. The Supreme Court has defined substantive rights as, "rights conferred by the law to be protected and enforced by the adjective law of judicial procedure." An example of a substantive right would be a state law on fraud, which may vary widely in composition depending on the jurisdiction. If the state law is merely procedural, or relating merely to the form and mode of judicial operations, then the federal court does not have to apply the conflicting state law. However, the substance-procedure distinction is a generality as the Court rejected any test based upon "litmus paper criterion." Thus, a choice between state and federal law must be made with reference to the underlying policy of the Erie decision.

The Court announced a modification of the "outcome-determinative" test in York, whereby the test must be applied in light of the twin aims of Erie, which are the discouragement of forum-shopping and avoidance of inequitable administration of the laws. Under this rule, state procedural law would not supplant federal procedural law if the differences in the outcome are nonsubstantial or trivial, fail to raise Equal Protection concerns, and are unlikely to influence the choice of forum.

=== Gasperini v. Center for Humanities (1996) ===
Gasperini v. Center for Humanities (1996) is a post-Hanna decision addressing a conflict between state and federal law for review of jury verdicts. The plaintiff, a well-known artist and photographer from New York, sued a New York museum in federal court in New York, for damages arising from the loss of some photographs and slides he had loaned the museum. A jury found in his favor and awarded damages. The defendant appealed, and the U.S. Court of Appeals for the Second Circuit reduced the damages award on appeal. Gasperini appealed to the U.S. Supreme Court.

The New York state provision, a "tort reform" measure, allowed reviewing appellate courts to overturn a jury verdict if it "deviates materially from what would be reasonable compensation." Pursuant to this law, the Second Circuit applied the state's appellate standard of review. However, the Supreme Court stated that federal courts, bound by the reexamination clause of the Seventh Amendment, could overturn a jury's finding of fact only if it "shocked the conscience."

Gasperini, and another recent Erie-area case, Semtek International Inc. v. Lockheed Martin Corp., have shown Erie has gone in a newer and even more complicated direction than the previous controlling cases, and that instead of selecting either federal or state law for a case, the federal court may be required to somehow blend federal and state law, depending on the issue. However, the possibility of blending in Erie does not open up an infinitude of possibilities. In both Gasperini and Semtek, the common thread is that the blending is done in a way that is calculated to advance the aims of Erie (and York): non-discrimination between litigants, and discouragement of forum shopping.[3]

=== Shady Grove Orthopedic Associates, P.A v. Allstate Insurance Co. (2010) ===
The case of Shady Grove Orthopedic Associates, P.A v. Allstate Insurance Co. (2010) questioned if a federal court has to follow a state law that prohibits class-action lawsuits for specific types of claims. Shady Grove initiated a class-action lawsuit against insurance company Allstate, claiming that the insurer failed to pay the mandatory interest on late insurance settlements as per New York State law. Seeking to get rid of the case, Allstate cited New York’s procedural law that bans class actions for recovering statutory penalties unless a law specifically permits them. The federal court sided with Allstate, concluding that the state’s restriction barred the class-action suit.

Shady Grove challenged the logic by arguing that Federal Rule of Civil Procedure 23 should override New York’s state rule. The Second Circuit of Appeals rejected this argument on the basis of the Erie Doctrine; because there was no conflict between the federal and state rules, the New York law took precedence over the Federal Rule of Civil Procedure.

When brought to the Supreme Court, the decision of the lower court was reversed and determined that New York’s state law does not prevent a federal court from hearing a class action under Rule 23. Justice Scalia delivered the majority opinion, stating that if a federal rule specifically addresses the legal question at hand, the federal rule takes precedence. Ruth Bader Ginsburg led the dissent and argued that the majority’s opinions inflated the federal government’s power and overshadowed state regulations. Both the dissenting and concurring opinions state that some state procedural rules have jurisdiction when being considered by the federal court. The Federal Rule, including Rule 23, depends on where it modifies procedure.
