= Margaret Morgan (slave) =

African-American woman born to former slaves (between 1800 and 1805–after 1837)

Margaret Morgan (between 1800 and 1805–after 1837) was an African-American woman who was born to former slaves. They were considered free by their slaveholder, but they had not received an official deed of manumission. They lived on their former slaveholder's property, where they then had a daughter, Margaret. After she was married and had children, her family was taken from her home in the middle of the night around late March 1837 at the request of the former slaveholder's widow, Margaret Ashmore. Morgan became the subject of legal cases at the county, state and national level from 1837 to 1842. Prigg v. Pennsylvania was tried before the United States Supreme Court and the four men who apprehended Morgan and her children were found to be not guilty.

The result of the decision meant that it would be easier for slaveholders to capture former slaves in free states and it would be difficult for Pennsylvania to prosecute the 1826 personal liberty law that would protect its citizens from being enslaved. It also led the way for the Fugitive Slave Act of 1850, which made it even easier for slave catchers to take black people from free states.

From a legal perspective, the core of the issue was whether or not states could legislate for the freedom and protection of its citizens. Because the arguments of the case were whether the case was a federal vs. state issue, the case did not consider that Margaret Morgan and her children were human beings that deserved protection under the law. It is unclear what became of Morgan and her children.

== Personal life ==
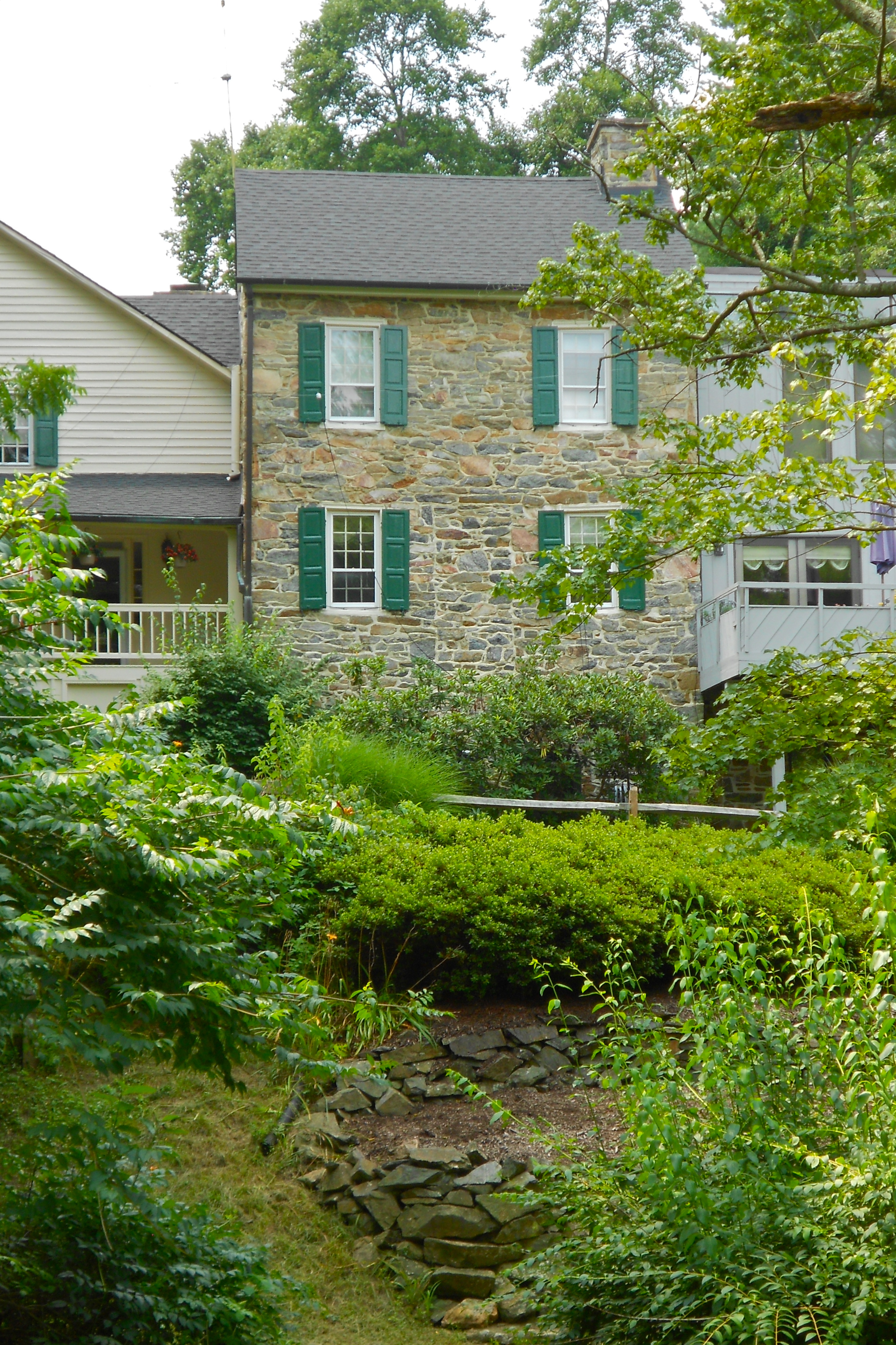
Mill Green Historic District, where Margaret Morgan grew up and started her married life.

Margaret ("Peg") was born between 1800 and 1805 in the Dublin district of Harford County, Maryland, off Prospect Road (Maryland Route 646) in the Mill Green area. Her parents, described as "aging, were owned by John Ashmore. He freed them after the War of 1812, but he had not granted them a deed of manumission. They may not have met the conditions set by the state of Maryland for manumission. Maryland state law stipulated that slaves could not be emancipated if they were more than 45 years of age, had a debilitating health condition, or if the sale would result in a "prejudice of creditors". In 1820, Ashmore had ten slaves. He freed six or more enslaved people through manumission before he died in 1823. There were only two slaves on the 1824 estate inventory, both of whom were boys. The inventory was signed off as a "true and perfect inventory of all goods and chattel" by Margaret Ashmore and Edward Prigg, who was a justice of the peace. Margaret Morgan may have been enslaved as a girl and young woman, but she and her parents were not included in the 1824 inventory.

Margaret and her parents lived on a plot on the Ashmore property. She lived free of any responsibilities for the Ashmore household.

She married Jerry Morgan in 1828, becoming Margaret Morgan. He was born free in Pennsylvania. A census taker recorded in 1830 that Margaret was a free black woman and they had two free black children. In 1832, after both of her parents had died, and after word had spread that she might be placed up for sale, the Morgans moved from Maryland into Pennsylvania, which took them over the Mason–Dixon line into a free state. They moved seven or eight miles away just over the border from Harford County to Airville in York County. Jerry Morgan worked for Matthew Wallace on Blain Road, near McCall's Ferry Road. (Note: Map: Blain Road at McCall's Ferry Road, near Airville, Maryland.) They are believed to have lived in one of Wallace's houses. They had a total of four or more children by 1837. (Note: The Maryland State Archives states that they had at least one additional child after they moved to Pennsylvania. The Liberator states that there were two or three children who were abducted. The Republican (originally from the Pennsylvania Telegraph and York Daily Record state that there were six children.)

John Ashmore knew Morgan was living north of Maryland (in a free state) and yet there were no attempts to collect Margaret and her children and there were no runaway advertisements for her in the newspapers over many years. Since slavery was outlawed in Pennsylvania it was reasonable to believe that Margaret and her children could expect to live freely. Paul Finkelman states in Story Telling on the Supreme Court: Prigg v Pennsylvania and Justice Joseph Story's Judicial Nationalism that several of her children were born free and Margaret may have been legitimately free by 1837.

== Societal and legislative conditions ==
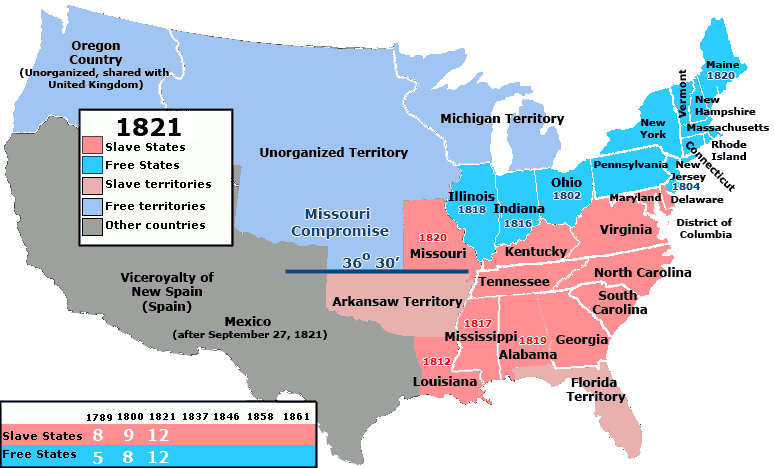
Map of slave and free states, 1821

Pennsylvania was the first state to pass An Act for the Gradual Abolition of Slavery in 1780, which meant that slaveholders could bring slaves into the state, but if they were there for more than six months, they are automatically considered free.

Partly in response to the national Fugitive Slave Act of 1793, Pennsylvania enacted a personal liberty law in 1826 that made it illegal to take anyone out of Pennsylvania to be enslaved. It also stipulated that in order to take a person out of the state to be a slave or servant, a warrant would need to be obtained from "any judge, justice of the peace or alderman". If a fugitive slave came to Pennsylvania and was in the state for one year or more when they had a child, the child would be a native of Pennsylvania.

Pennsylvania and other Northern states were trying to distinguish legitimate claims by slave owners from false claims by slave catchers and bounty hunters who kidnapped free blacks to make money. It was thought that if the claim was real, the slave owner would follow the process. But if it was false, the kidnapper would not pursue the claim. Still, Southerners were displeased with what they viewed as a violation of their constitutional rights.

— Alison Morretta, Legal Debates of the Antislavery Movement (Note: They cited the Fugitive Slave Act of 1793 and Article IV of the United States Constitution to reclaim their property.)

In 1831, the Nat Turner's slave rebellion by free and enslaved African Americans resulted in tension between white and black people. Fear among white people led to their attempts to limit the rights of African Americans. Another factor that impacted this case was that the economics had changed over time so that it was not as advantageous to keep slaves in Maryland as it was for the cotton-growing states in the south. There was a drop of 10% of the number of slaves and a 50% increase in the number of free black people in Maryland in the decade prior to the incident. Slaves feared that with reduced demand in Maryland, they might be sold to southern states, like Mississippi and Alabama, where there was a high demand for enslaved people and higher sales prices. Due to the fear of being sent to the cotton and sugar plantations in the Deep South— where the work would be significantly harder for slaves than in Maryland, Delaware or Virginia—there were many enslaved blacks who escaped over the border into and through Pennsylvania.

== Capture ==
John Ashmore's wife, Margaret, (Note: Finkelman, the History of York County group, and the National Register of Historic Places state that Margaret Ashmore was John Ashmore's wife. The Maryland State Archives state that Margaret Ashmore was either the widow or daughter of John Ashmore.) was an heir to her husband's estate. She decided in 1837 that she should have Morgan and her children brought to Maryland to live and work as slaves. (Note: The personal inventory taken in 1824 showed a total of $509 more than half of which ($315) was for the two slaves, a 12 year old and 14 year old boy.) The farm went to Ashmore's daughter Susanna (Note: The Maryland State Archives state that she may have been Ashmore's niece or his daughter.) and her husband Nathan Bemis. Ashmore's wife, Margaret continued to live there after his death. She hired Edward Prigg and Nathan Bemis, an in-law, to find the Morgans. Nathan Bemis scouted out the area and found where the Morgans lived.

Prigg, Bemis, and two other men assembled to apprehend Morgan. As required by the personal liberty law of Pennsylvania, they contacted a justice of the peace, Thomas Henderson, of York, County. He issued a warrant for Morgan and her children's arrest. The men were told to contact William McCleary, the constable of York County, who went with them to capture the Morgans. (Note: Pagan states that Prigg returned to Maryland at some point to form a posse.)

McCleary and the slave hunters went to the Morgan's house around late March 1837 (Note: The Republican reported that the event occurred by March 22, 1837, The Liberator reported on March 31, 1837 that the event had already occurred, and according to the York County indictment of Prigg, Margaret Morgan and her family were captured on April 1, 1837.) while its family members were asleep. They captured the entire family in their bed clothes and "with force and violence, feloniously" took the family. They were taken in "an open wagon in a cold sleety rain, with scarcely their ordinary clothes on." After facing local activists, they sought a certificate for removal from Henderson at his house. Henderson released Jerry Morgan, who was born free and he would not authorize the removal of Margaret and her children to Maryland. He believed that Morgan and her children were free according to state law. He was said to have "refused to take further cognizance of the case" because the Morgans and Prigg's group told different stories. They were unable to find a judge who would provide the certificate, so Prigg, Bemise and the other slave capturers waited until Jerry had left his house and took Morgan and her children a second time. They were put into a jail in Bel Air in Harford County, Maryland. County Judge Stevenson Archer sanctioned their sale. They may have been sold to a slave trader soon after they were brought to Maryland. (Note: She is reported to have been sold as early as March 22, 1837, but unable to find both halves of the ad for the March 22 date posted on a web site. There is an article of the same information in a March 27, 1837 newspaper article in The Adams Sentinel.) There were attempts to free her and the children, but she may have been taken out of the area before the petition could be adjudicated. The governors of Pennsylvania, Joseph Ritner, and Maryland, Thomas W. Veazey, were made aware of the case. Ritner was firmly anti-slavery.

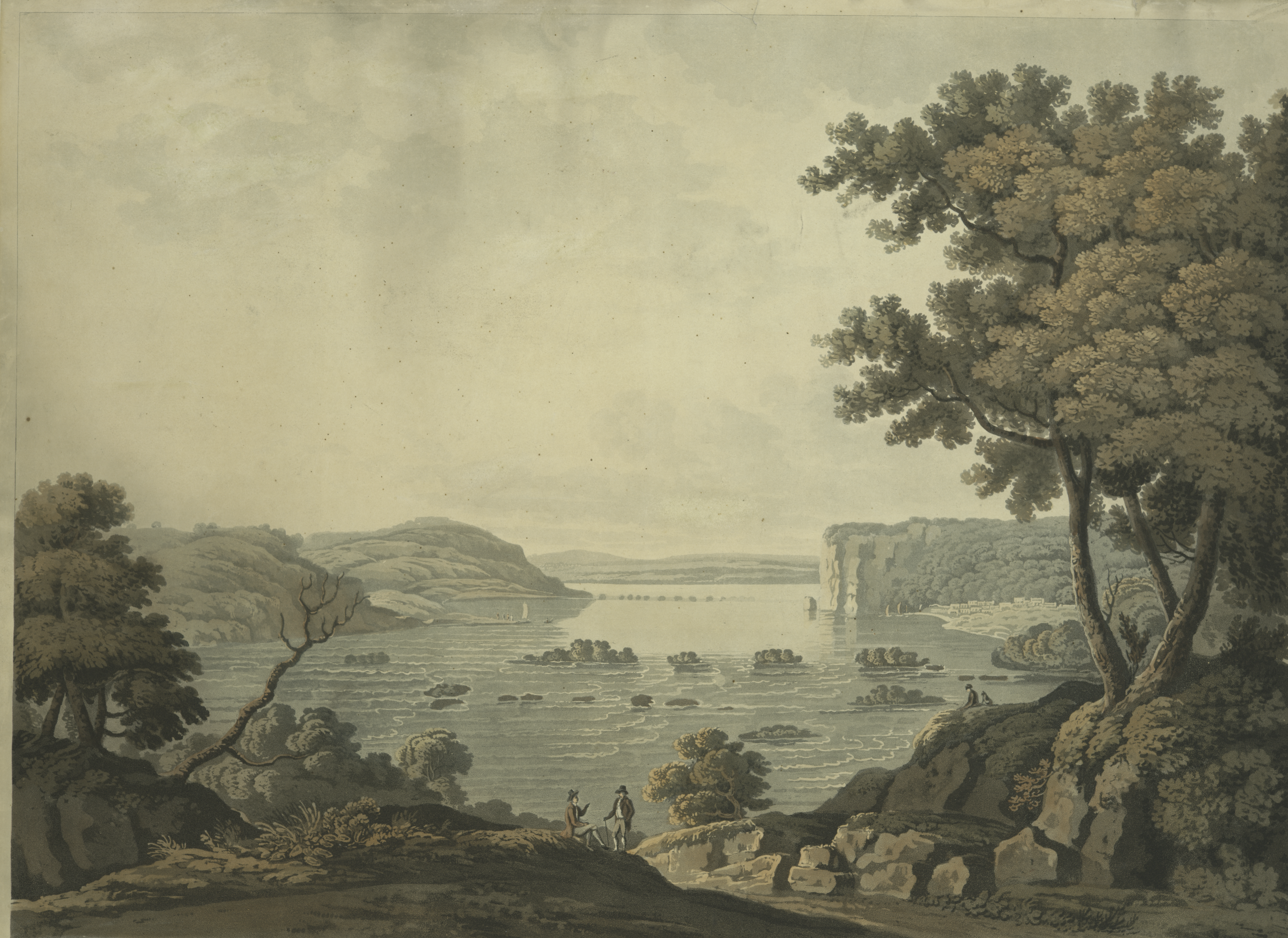
Wright's Ferry on the Susquehanna River, Pennsylvania

Jerry traveled to the state capital several times to persuade Governor Ritner to support him in freeing his family. On his last trip, he took a boat headed for Columbia, Pennsylvania to bring him home. During the journey, Jerry, the only black person on the boat, was accused of stealing a man's coat. After his hands were tied and he was threatened, he jumped off the boat into the Susquehanna and Tidewater Canal and the Susquehanna River. He drowned when the current took him deep in the water.

== Trial ==
Historically speaking, women of color have held the least amount of agency, awaiting the decisions of those in power.

— Prigg v. Pennsylvania: Quiet site for high court case

When the case was tried, the York County prosecutor, Thomas Hably, claimed that Henderson was reluctant to be involved in the case because he came to realize that the capture was unlawful according to the personal liberty law of 1826. Hably may have tried to have the Morgans returned to Pennsylvania, but he was unsuccessful. A grand jury was held in Pennsylvania that resulted in the indictment of Prigg and the other men for violating the Personal Liberty Law of 1826 and they were convicted of kidnapping. The officials in Maryland, however, would not release the Morgans. Prigg argued that it was unconstitutional to forbid slaveholders from getting fugitive slaves, which is what he considered Morgan to be.

A freedom petition was adjudicated a county court in October 1837 that found in favor of Margaret Ashmore. In 1839, a trial was held in Pennsylvania. Prigg was the only person who was tried and he was found guilty of kidnapping. The Prigg v. Pennsylvania case was appealed, ultimately up to the United States Supreme Court in 1842. The court decided in the favor of Prigg. They found that state law should not supersede federal law, Article IV of the United States Constitution allowed for the return of fugitive slaves, and the state law violated the Fugitive Slave Act of 1793.

In his opinion, Justice Story glossed over these possibilities [that some or all of the Morgans were free] in his desire to write a sweeping nationalistic opinion striking down Pennsylvania’s personal liberty law of 1826, despite the fact that the circumstances of Morgan's life underscore the necessity of such laws to prevent free blacks who might be enslaved under the color of federal law.

— Paul Finkelman, Story Telling on the Supreme Court: Prigg v Pennsylvania and Justice Joseph Story's Judicial Nationalism

The arguments for the case did not include whether Morgan and her children were people, who were entitled to freedom.

The effect of the Supreme Court decision was that it would make it easier for slaveholders to apprehend people in free states, and it would be harder to prosecute state personal liberty laws. Some states enacted laws that forbid officials with carrying out the Fugitive Slave Act of 1793, which then resulted in creation of the national Fugitive Slave Act of 1850, which made it easier to catch fugitive slaves and made it illegal and more dangerous for people, like those who had been conductors on the Underground Railroad to assist fugitive slaves.

The fate of Margaret Morgan and her children is unclear. There are records that show that Morgan and her children were sold to a slaveholder from the south. Judge Stevenson Archer is not noted to have sanctioned the sale. There are records, as well, that show that Morgan and her children lived in Cecil County, Maryland until about 1870. Those sold to the south were believed to have returned to Maryland at some point. After that, they went south or west of Maryland or were sold to another slaveholder. She may have had a son who escaped from his slaveholder in Maryland. On June 8, 1857, a newspaper ad stated that 21-year-old Edward Morgan was a runaway and that $500 would be paid for his return. The Maryland State Archives, however, states that there were no known transactions for the sale of the family. There was no evidence that the Ashmores lived in Harford County after 1830.
