= Erie Railroad Co. v. Tompkins =

1938 U.S. Supreme Court case on diversity jurisdiction

Coordinates: 41.3290°N 75.7775°W

- Supreme Court of the United States

Argued January 31, 1938 Decided April 25, 1938
- Full case name: Erie Railroad Company v. Harry J. Tompkins
- Citations: 304 U.S. 64 (more) 58 S. Ct. 817; 82 L. Ed. 1188; 1938 U.S. LEXIS 984; 11 Ohio Op. 246; 114 A.L.R. 1487

Case history
- Prior: Judgment for plaintiff, S.D.N.Y.; affirmed, 90 F.2d 603 (2nd. Cir. 1937); cert. granted, 302 U.S. 671 (1937).
- Subsequent: On remand, reversed, judgment directed for defendant, 98 F.2d 49 (2nd Cir. 1938)

Holding
- Under the Rules of Decision Act, federal district courts in diversity jurisdiction cases must apply state law, including the judicial precedents of states' highest courts, where it does not conflict with federal law. There is no general federal common law. Second Circuit Court of Appeals reversed and remanded.

Court membership
- Chief Justice Charles E. Hughes Associate Justices James C. McReynolds · Louis Brandeis; Pierce Butler · Harlan F. Stone; Owen Roberts · Benjamin N. Cardozo; Hugo Black · Stanley F. Reed

Case opinions
- Majority: Brandeis, joined by Hughes, Stone, Roberts, Black
- Concurrence: Reed
- Dissent: Butler, joined by McReynolds
- Cardozo took no part in the consideration or decision of the case.

Laws applied
- U.S. Const. art. III (implied); Judiciary Act of 1789 § 34 (now 28 U.S.C. § 725); Rules of Decision Act (now 28 U.S.C. § 1652)
- This case overturned a previous ruling or rulings
- Swift v. Tyson (1842)

Erie Railroad Co. v. Tompkins, 304 U.S. 64 (1938), is a landmark decision of the Supreme Court of the United States which held that the United States does not have a general federal common law and that U.S. federal courts must apply state law, not federal law, to any lawsuit between parties from different states that does not involve federal questions. The Court's decision overturned nearly a century of case law on federal civil procedure and established the foundation of the modern law of diversity jurisdiction.

Although Erie is not widely known among non-experts, most American legal scholars and lawyers regard it as one of the most important decisions in U.S. Supreme Court history. The decision "goes to the heart" of the American system of federalism and the relationship between the U.S. federal government and the states.

== Legal background ==
Under the traditional view of the United States' system of federalism, each U.S. state is a sovereign polity in all aspects other than those the U.S. Constitution commits to the federal government, which has supremacy over the states in those areas. Consequently, each U.S. state has its own courts and legal system governing areas such as property law, contract law, tort law, commercial law, criminal law, and family law. Due to the United States' historical origins in the British Empire, all U.S. states except Louisiana have inherited or adopted the English common law for their legal systems.

Shortly after the Constitution's ratification, Congress passed the Judiciary Act of 1789, which created the U.S. federal court system underneath the U.S. Supreme Court. The Act gave U.S. federal courts diversity jurisdiction, allowing them to hear lawsuits between citizens of different states involving disputes over substantial sums of money, even when no questions of federal law are involved. Section 34 of the Judiciary Act—known as the Rules of Decision Act—provided that federal courts would apply state laws when adjudicating lawsuits between citizens of different states.

The laws of the several states, except where the Constitution or treaties of the United States or Acts of Congress otherwise require or provide, shall be regarded as rules of decision in civil actions in the courts of the United States, in cases where they apply.

— Judiciary Act of 1789, section 34 ("Rules of Decision Act") (28 U.S.C. § 1652). (Note: The statute originally read "shall be regarded as rules of decision in trials at common law ...." Congress changed the phrase "trials at common law" to "civil actions" in 1948.)

Interpreting the meaning of this statute has been one of the most difficult legal issues in American federal jurisprudence. It provides that U.S. federal courts shall apply state law when hearing cases under diversity jurisdiction. It does not specify, however, whether the phrase "the laws of the several States" means only statutes passed by a state's legislature, or whether it also includes the common law decisions of a state's supreme court.

The U.S. Supreme Court addressed the question in its 1842 decision Swift v. Tyson. In Swift, the Court ruled that the Rules of Decision Act's phrase "laws of the several States" referred only to each state's statutory laws passed by their legislatures, and did not include each state supreme court's interpretation and construction of the English common law. The Court concluded that this allowed U.S. federal courts to create a general American "federal common law" for federal courts that would cover areas such as commercial law. But applying the Court's holding in Swift proved difficult, and American lawyers, judges, and legal scholars became increasingly opposed to it during the late 19th and early 20th centuries.

== Case history ==
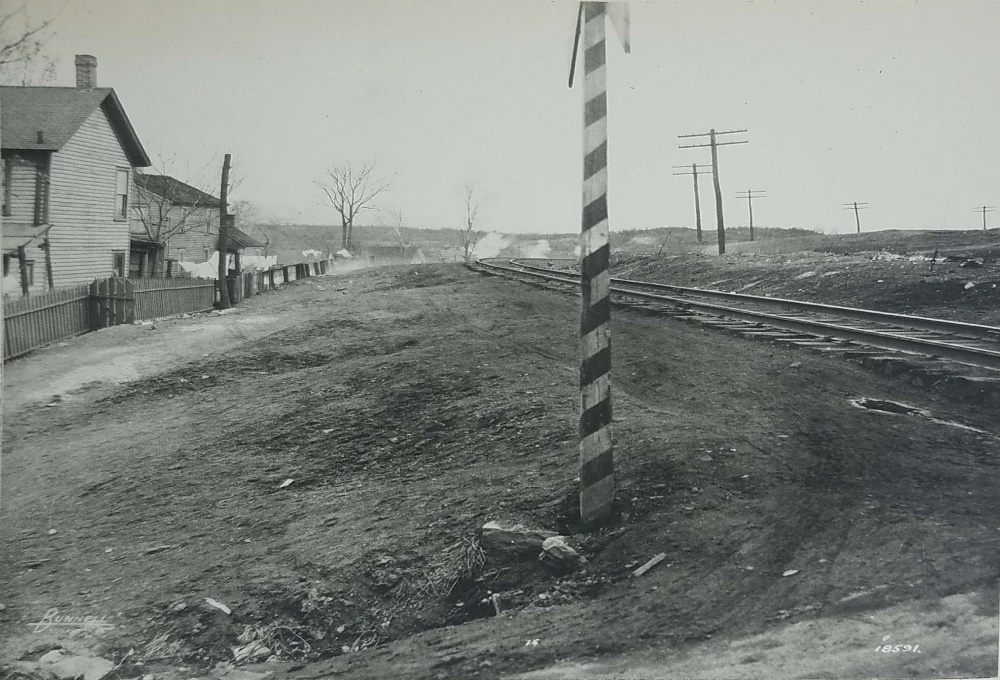
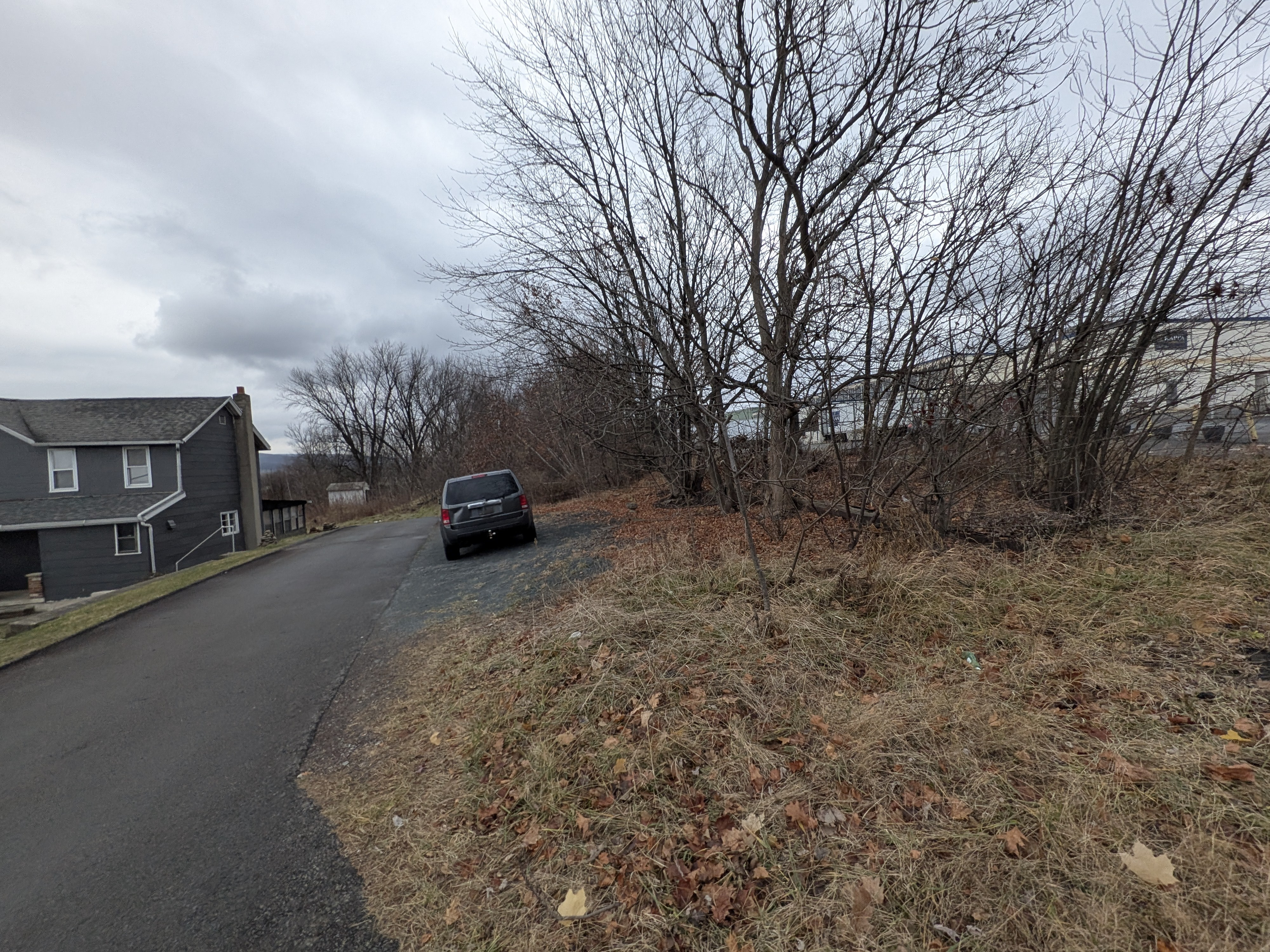
The incident location, as viewed in 1937 and 2024.

The Erie case involved an incident that took place in the early hours of July 27, 1934, in Hughestown, Pennsylvania. Local resident Harry Tompkins was walking home in the darkness on a pathway that ran alongside a railroad track. An oncoming train approached and, as it passed, an object protruding from one of the train cars—said to be an unlatched door—hit Tompkins and knocked him to the ground. He landed on the railroad tracks, and the train's wheels crushed his right arm beyond repair. An ambulance took him to a local hospital, where doctors amputated most of his arm.

The train that hit Tompkins was owned and operated by the Erie Railroad Company. After he recovered, Tompkins sued the company for negligence. Because Tompkins resided in Pennsylvania and Erie Railroad was incorporated in New York, Tompkins invoked diversity jurisdiction and filed his lawsuit in U.S. federal court, rather than in Pennsylvania or New York state court. The case was tried in the U.S. District Court for the Southern District of New York, with U.S. district judge Samuel Mandelbaum presiding.

At trial, Erie Railroad's lawyers argued that Pennsylvania law should govern Tompkins's negligence claim. The pathway along which Tompkins had been walking when the train struck him was an Erie Railroad right-of-way. Past decisions of the Supreme Court of Pennsylvania had held that, under Pennsylvania law, a person walking along a railroad company's right-of-way was a trespasser to whom the railroad was not liable for negligence unless its negligence was "wanton" or "wilful". Because Tompkins had not alleged that Erie Railroad had been wantonly or willfully negligent, the railroad's lawyers made a motion to dismiss his claim, citing these Pennsylvania cases. Mandelbaum denied the motion, ruling that under Swift v. Tyson Tompkins's claim was governed by federal common law, not by Pennsylvania law. The case went to trial, where the jury found Erie Railroad liable for Tompkins's injuries and awarded him $30,000 in damages (equivalent to $700,000 in 2025).

Erie Railroad appealed the verdict to the U.S. Court of Appeals for the Second Circuit. U.S. circuit judges Thomas Walter Swan, Martin Thomas Manton, and Learned Hand heard the appeal and ruled in Tompkins's favor, affirming the trial court's verdict. The railroad then appealed to the U.S. Supreme Court, which agreed to hear the case and granted certiorari.

== Supreme Court decision ==
On April 25, 1938, the Supreme Court issued a 6–2 (Note: Due to poor health, justice Benjamin Cardozo did not sit for oral argument or participate in the Court's decision.) decision in favor of Erie Railroad, overruling Swift v. Tyson and holding that, when sitting in diversity, U.S. federal courts must apply state law instead of "general federal common law".

=== Opinion of the Court ===
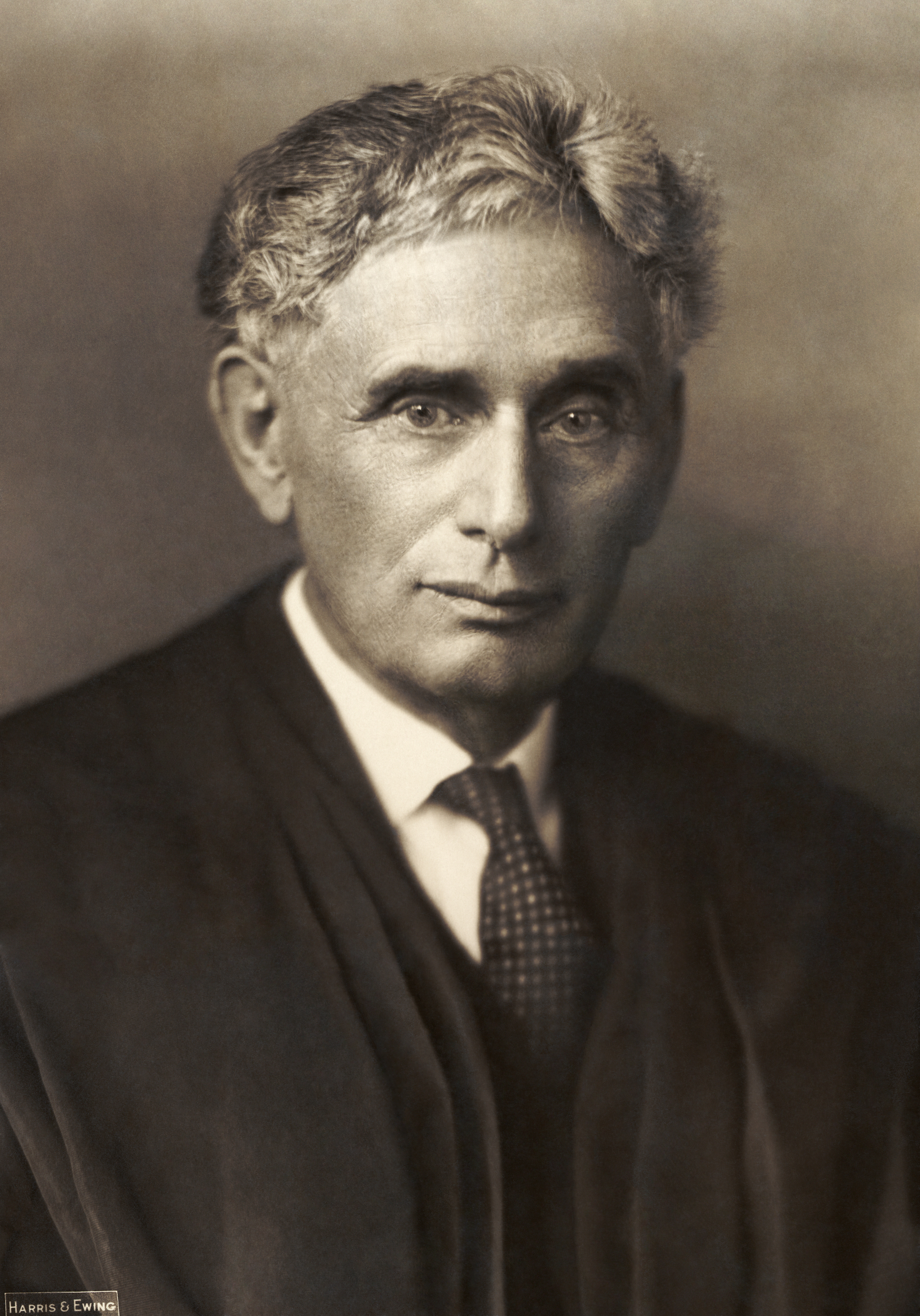
Justice Louis Brandeis, the author of the majority opinion in Erie

For the purposes of the decision's core holding, six justices formed the majority and joined an opinion written by justice Louis Brandeis. (Note: Justice Stanley F. Reed concurred in the Court's core holdings that Swift v. Tyson should be overruled and that federal courts adjudicating state-law claims under diversity jurisdiction must apply state law rather than "general" federal common law. But he dissented from the Court's holding that the Swift doctrine was unconstitutional, making the Court's decision on that point 5–3 instead of 6–2.)

The Court began by framing the case around the question of "whether the oft-challenged doctrine of Swift v. Tyson shall now be disapproved." The Court first reviewed the history of the Swift doctrine. It referenced the research of American legal scholar Charles Warren, who in a 1923 Harvard Law Review article had published evidence of an earlier draft of the Rules of Decision Act that explicitly included states' common laws in its definition of "the laws of the several states". The Court concluded that Warren's discovery proved that the Swift Court's interpretation of the Act had been "erroneous".

The Court next explained that the Swift doctrine had not produced the legal uniformity the Court had hoped it would, but had instead allowed litigants from other states to discriminate against other litigants in their home states. The Court said that because the Swift doctrine dictated that a lawsuit between two in-state parties would be decided under state law while an identical lawsuit between an in-state party and an out-of-state party would be decided under federal common law, the Swift doctrine was allowing plaintiffs to manipulate which law would be applied to their lawsuits by strategically filing them in specific state or federal courts—a practice now known as "forum shopping". The Court decried this practice, saying that it allowed plaintiffs to introduce "grave discrimination" against parties from other states.

Furthermore, the Court held that the Swift doctrine had not only been a "social and political" failure, but had also been unconstitutional. (Note: Justice Stanley F. Reed did not join the Court's conclusion that Swift v. Tyson had been unconstitutional, making the Court's holding on that point 5‑3, not 6‑2.)

If only a question of statutory construction were involved, we should not be prepared to abandon a doctrine so widely applied throughout nearly a century. But the unconstitutionality of the course pursued has now been made clear, and compels us to do so.

— Erie, 304 U.S. at 77–78.

Having determined that the Swift doctrine was unconstitutional, the opinion's third section declared that there is no general U.S. federal common law, and that U.S. federal courts hearing cases under diversity-of-citizenship jurisdiction must apply state laws as construed by state supreme courts.

Except in matters governed by the Federal Constitution or by Acts of Congress, the law to be applied in any case is the law of the State. And whether the law of the State shall be declared by its Legislature in a statute or by its highest court in a decision is not a matter of federal concern. There is no federal general common law. Congress has no power to declare substantive rules of common law applicable in a State, whether they be local in their nature or "general," be they commercial law or a part of the law of torts. And no clause in the Constitution purports to confer such a power upon the federal courts.

— Erie, 304 U.S. at 78.

The Court emphasized that its ruling was not meant to strike down any federal laws, but was only intended to "declare that in applying the [Swift] doctrine this Court and the lower courts have invaded rights which in our opinion are reserved by the Constitution to the several States."

Applying its holding to the facts of Tompkins's case, the Court held that both the district court and the Second Circuit had erred by not applying Pennsylvania law to Tompkins's claim against Erie Railroad. The Court reversed the Second Circuit's decision and remanded the case, instructing the court to determine whether the railroad company's interpretation of Pennsylvania law had been correct.

=== Reed's concurrence in the judgment ===
Justice Stanley F. Reed concurred only in the judgment. Reed agreed with the Court's core holding that Swift v. Tyson should be overruled and that federal courts should apply state law when deciding cases under diversity jurisdiction. Reed disagreed with the Court's conclusion that the Swift doctrine was unconstitutional, however, saying instead it had been merely an erroneous interpretation of the Rules of Decision Act.

=== Butler's dissent ===
Justice Pierce Butler filed a dissenting opinion, joined by Justice James McReynolds, in which he argued the majority had engaged in judicial activism. He asserted the majority had completely rewritten the two questions presented in the petition for certiorari as a constitutional question, when there really was no constitutional issue. He pointed out that no one in this case had directly challenged the Swift regime, which the Court had adhered to for so long in so many cases.

== Aftermath ==
On remand, the three Second Circuit judges determined that Erie Railroad's characterization of Pennsylvania law—that a person walking along a railroad right of way was a trespasser to whom the railroad was not liable for negligence unless the negligence was "wanton" or "wilful"—had been correct. The judges concluded that Tompkins had neither alleged nor shown any evidence that Erie Railroad's negligence had been "wanton", and they therefore held that Erie Railroad was entitled to a directed verdict. This forced the district court to enter a new judgment in favor of Erie Railroad. Tompkins lost his $30,000 damages award and received nothing.

== Subsequent jurisprudence ==
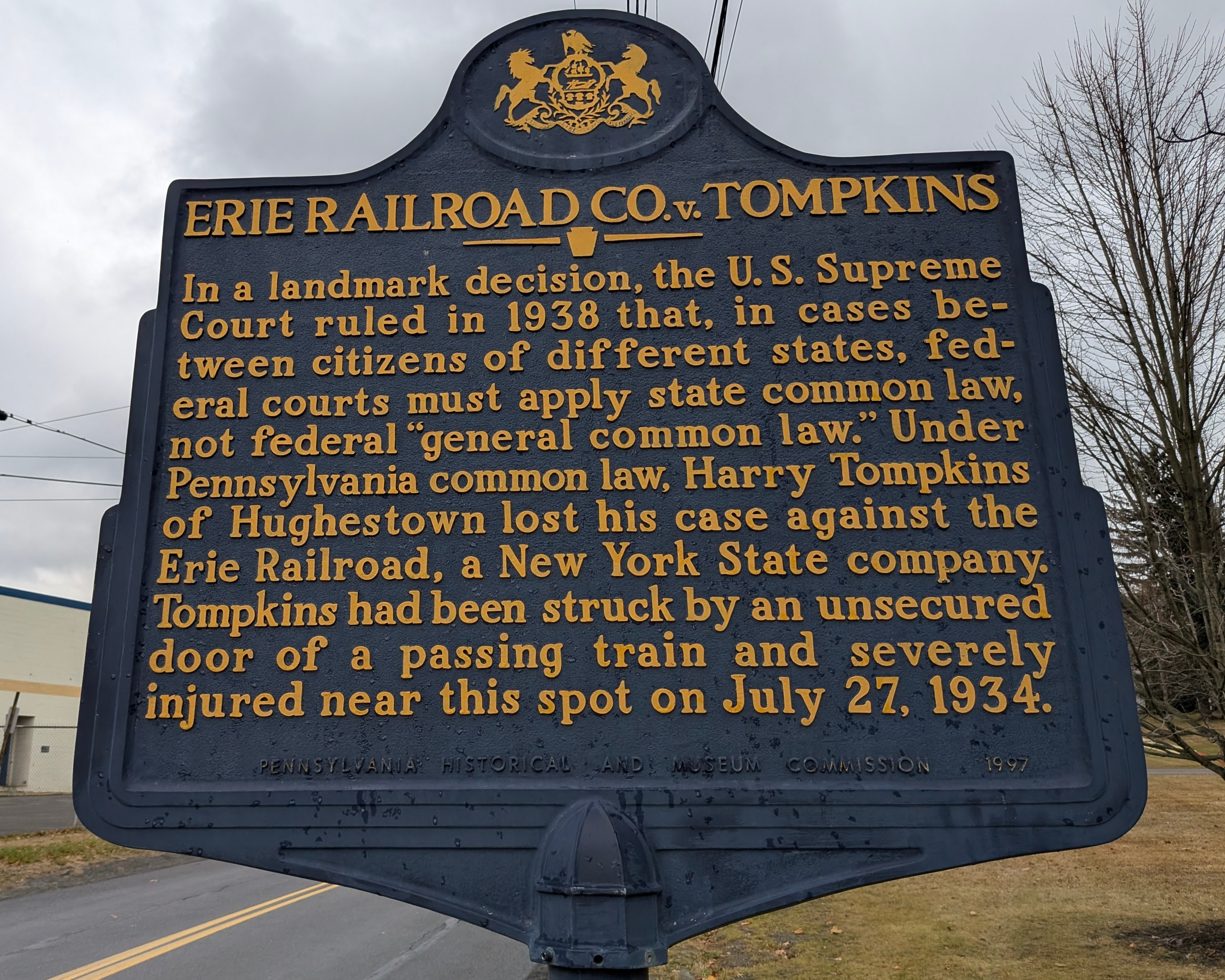
A plaque near the incident scene.

Later opinions limited the application of Erie to substantive state law; federal courts can generally use the Federal Rules of Civil Procedure while hearing state law claims.

It can be a problem for federal courts to know what a state court would decide on an issue of first impression (i.e., one not previously considered by state courts). In such circumstances, federal courts engage in what is informally called an "Erie guess". This "guess", actually a carefully reasoned attempt to anticipate what the state's courts would decide, is not binding on state courts themselves, which may adopt the federal court's reasoning if and when the issue reaches them in some other case, or may decide the issue differently. In the latter case, future federal courts would be required to follow the state's precedents, although a final judgment in the "guessed" case would not be reopened.

Alternatively, federal courts can certify questions to a state supreme court, so long as the state itself has a procedure in place to allow this. For example, some federal district (trial) courts can certify questions to state supreme courts, but other states allow only federal courts of appeal (circuit) courts to do so. In the latter situation, an Erie guess would be the only option available for the federal court attempting to apply state law.

Erie Railroad is considered one of the major examples where the Supreme Court has exceptionally gone against the principle of party presentation, as neither party had suggested a need to review Swift but the Court took it up themselves to review and ultimately overturn it.

Australian courts have rejected the Erie doctrine, despite an analogous federal-state common law structure and verbiage in the Australian Judiciary Act 1903 borrowed from the Rules of Decision Act. In rejecting Erie, Australian jurists have noted the Privy Council's historic authority to hear appeals from Australian state courts on questions of common law.

== See also ==
- Erie Doctrine
- List of United States Supreme Court cases, volume 304
