= USS Clearfield =

Attack transport ship in United States Navy

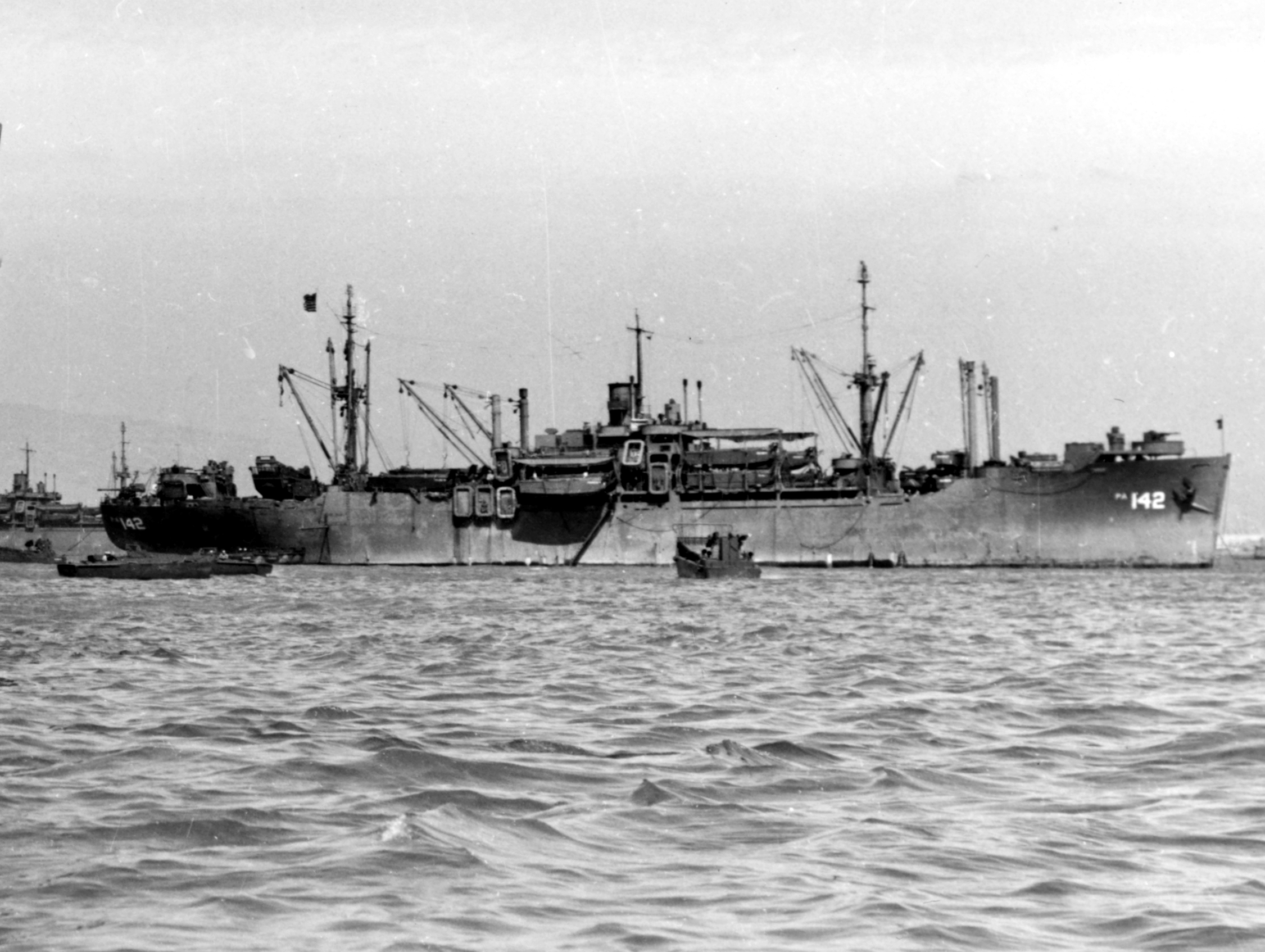

History

United States
- Name: USS Clearfield
- Namesake: Clearfield County, Pennsylvania
- Builder: California Shipbuilding
- Launched: 21 November 1944
- Commissioned: 12 January 1945
- Decommissioned: 4 March 1946
- Honors and awards: 1 Battle star
- Fate: Sold for scrap, 9 April 1973

General characteristics
- Class & type: Haskell-class attack transport
- Displacement: 6,873 tons (lt), 14,837 t (fl)
- Length: 455 ft (139 m)
- Beam: 62 ft (19 m)
- Draft: 24 ft (7 m)
- Propulsion: 1 × geared turbine, 2 × header-type boilers, 1 × propeller, designed 8,500 shp (6,338 kW)
- Speed: 17 knots (31 km/h; 20 mph)
- Boats & landing craft carried: 2 × LCM; 12 × LCVP; 3 × LCPL
- Capacity: Troops: 86 officers, 1,475 enlisted; Cargo: 150,000 cu ft, 2,900 tons
- Complement: 56 officers, 480 enlisted
- Armament: 1 × 5"/38 dual-purpose gun; 4 × twin 40 mm guns; 10 × single 20 mm guns; late armament, add 1 × 40 mm quad mount

USS Clearfield (APA-142) was a Haskell-class attack transport in service with the United States Navy from 1945 to 1946. She was scrapped in 1973.

== History ==
Clearfield was a Victory ship design, VC2-S-AP5 and was named after Clearfield County, Pennsylvania, United States. She was launched 21 November 1944 by California Shipbuilding Corp., Wilmington, Los Angeles, under a United States Maritime Commission contract; sponsored by Mrs. F. L. Chambers; acquired by the Navy 11 January 1945; and commissioned 12 January 1945.

Clearfield loaded construction battalion troops and cargo at Port Hueneme, California, and departed 9 March 1945 for Pearl Harbor, Eniwetok, Ulithi and Okinawa, where she arrived 17 April, to disembark her passengers and their equipment at Ie Shima, to build an airfield.

She sailed from Okinawa 26 April to load Army replacements at San Francisco and transported these troops to Manila, arriving 23 June. After moving occupation troops among the Philippine Islands, Clearfield departed Manila 27 August for Tokyo, where she landed soldiers 2 September.

From 4 September 1945 Clearfield operated between Okinawa and Manila and ports in China, supporting the reoccupation of northern China by transporting Marines and Chinese troops. She got underway for Tacoma, Washington, 2 December, and after overhaul, sailed to Norfolk, arriving 4 February 1946. Clearfield was decommissioned 4 March 1946, and returned to the War Shipping Administration 6 March 1946.

=== Fate ===
Ex-Clearfield was laid up in the National Defense Reserve Fleet at James River, Virginia. Between 2 September and 27 October 1955 she was withdrawn from the Reserve Fleet for a Repair Program, GAA- Polarus, and returned. Ex-Clearfield was sold for $111,560 to Union Minerals & Alloys Corporation for scrapping on 9 April 1973. At 1440 EDT, on 7 September 1973 she was withdrawn from the Reserve Fleet and sent to the breaker's yard.

== Awards ==
Clearfield received one battle star for World War II service.
