= Clearfield Farm =

Historic house in Delaware, US

- U.S. National Register of Historic Places
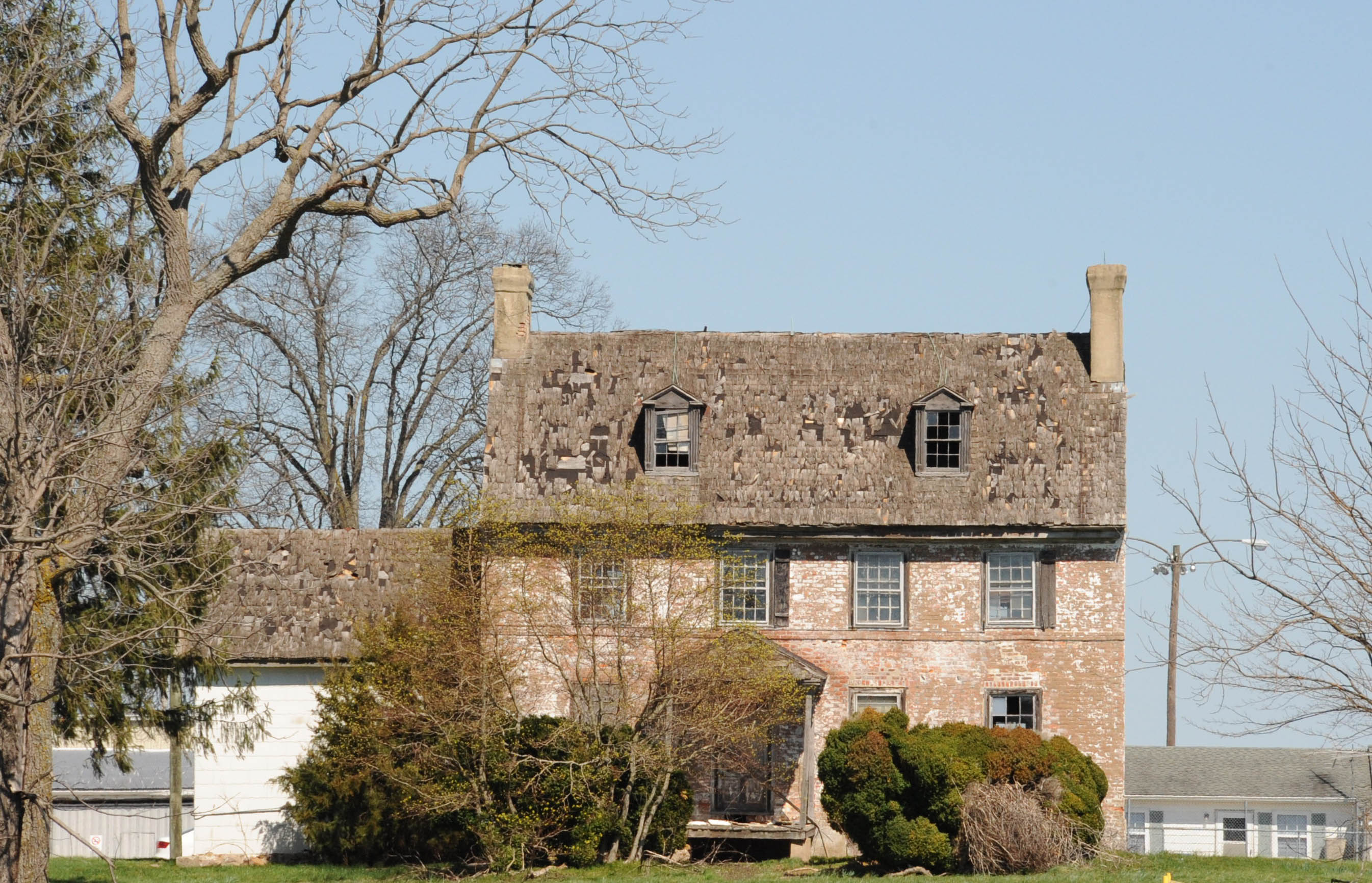

- Location within Delaware Location within the United States
- Location: 867 Smyrna Landing Road, near Smyrna, Delaware
- Coordinates: 39°19′43″N 75°36′6″W
- Area: 1 acre (0.40 ha)
- Built: c. 1755
- NRHP reference No.: 73000540
- Added to NRHP: March 20, 1973

Clearfield Farm is a historic home located near Smyrna in New Castle County, Delaware, United States. It was built about 1755 and is a 2 1/2-story, four bay brick dwelling with a gable roof. It is one room deep and has gable end chimneys and dormers. It was the home of John Clark (1761–1821), 20th Governor of Delaware. At one time it housed administrative offices for the Department of Corrections.

It was listed on the National Register of Historic Places in 1973.
