= Prigg v. Pennsylvania =

- Supreme Court of the United States

Decided March 1, 1842
- Full case name: Edward Prigg v. Commonwealth of Pennsylvania
- Citations: 41 U.S. 539 (more) 16 Pet. 539; 10 L. Ed. 1060; 1842 U.S. LEXIS 387

Case history
- Prior: In error to the Supreme Court of Pennsylvania.

Holding
- Federal law is superior to state law, but states are not required to use their resources to enforce federal law.

Court membership
- Chief Justice Roger B. Taney Associate Justices Joseph Story · Smith Thompson; John McLean · Henry Baldwin; James M. Wayne · John Catron; John McKinley · Peter V. Daniel

Case opinions
- Majority: Story
- Concurrence: Taney
- Concurrence: Thompson
- Concurrence: Wayne
- Concurrence: Daniel
- Dissent: McLean

Prigg v. Pennsylvania, 41 U.S. (16 Pet.) 539 (1842), was a United States Supreme Court case in which the court held that the Fugitive Slave Act of 1793 precluded a Pennsylvania personal liberty law that prohibited alleged fugitive slaves from being taken out of the state without due process. The Court overturned the conviction of slavecatcher Edward Prigg as a result.

Occurring under the presidency of John Tyler, Prigg v. Pennsylvania weakened the enforcement mechanisms of the Fugitive Slave Act of 1793 by allowing states to forbid their officials from cooperating in the return of fugitive slaves. But, by asserting federal government authority and responsibility over the area of fugitive slaves, it set the stage for future more stringent laws that would bypass individual state decisions about slavery. (Northern states by this time had abolished slavery, and most prohibited slaveowners from bringing slaves to their states, saying they would be considered free if brought in state.) Later, the Fugitive Slave Law of 1850 (part of the Compromise of 1850) required even free states to support capture and return of fugitive slaves with their law enforcement, increasing penalties for non-compliance.

Also, by refusing to take judicial notice of the problem of free blacks being kidnapped in free states and sold into slavery, the Prigg decision established an implicit precedent that blacks were entitled to fewer procedural protections than were whites.

== Federal law ==
In March 1789, the Constitution of the United States came into force, having been ratified by nine states. Article IV, Section 2 contained two clauses (the Extradition Clause and the Fugitive Slave Clause) related to the legality of fleeing justice, creditors, owners, or other agencies across state borders and to escaped slaves, but it did not mention "slavery" directly:

- "A person charged in any state with treason, felony or other crime, who shall flee from justice, and be found in another state, shall, on demand of the executive authority of the state from which he fled, be delivered up, to be removed to the state having jurisdiction of the crime."
- "No person held to service or labor in one state, under the laws thereof, escaping into another, shall, in consequence of any law or regulation therein, be discharged from such service or labor; but shall be delivered up, on claim of the party to whom such service or labor may be due." (This clause was superseded by the Thirteenth Amendment, ratified on December 6, 1865.)

On February 12, 1793, the Congress passed the Fugitive Slave Law of 1793, the long title of which was "An Act respecting fugitives from justice, and persons escaping from the service of their masters."

== State law ==
On March 29, 1788, the State of Pennsylvania passed an amendment to one of its laws (An Act for the Gradual Abolition of Slavery, originally enacted March 1, 1780): "No negro or mulatto slave... shall be removed out of this state, with the design and intention that the place of abode or residence of such slave or servant shall be thereby altered or changed."

On March 26, 1826, the State of Pennsylvania passed a further law:

If any person or persons shall, from and after the passing of this act, by force and violence, take and carry away, or cause to be taken or carried away, and shall, by fraud or false pretense, seduce, or cause to be seduced, or shall attempt so to take, carry away or seduce, any negro or mulatto, from any part or parts of this commonwealth, to any other place or places whatsoever, out of this commonwealth, with a design and intention of selling and disposing of, or of causing to be sold, or of keeping and detaining, or of causing to be kept and detained, such negro or mulatto, as a slave or servant for life, or for any term whatsoever, every such person or persons, his or their aiders or abettors, shall on conviction thereof, in any court of this commonwealth having competent jurisdiction, be deemed guilty of a felony.

== Background ==
In 1832, a black woman named Margaret Morgan moved to Pennsylvania from Maryland. There she had been born into slavery and held by John Ashmore. In Maryland, she had lived in virtual freedom but Ashmore had never formally manumitted her. After his death, Ashmore's heirs eventually decided to claim her as a slave and hired slavecatcher Edward Prigg to recover her.

On April 1, 1837, Prigg led an assault and abduction on Morgan in York County, Pennsylvania. They took Morgan to Maryland, intending to sell her as a slave (her children, one of whom was born free in Pennsylvania, were also captured and sold). The four men involved in the abduction were arraigned under the 1826 act. Prigg pleaded not guilty and argued that he had been duly appointed by Ashmore heirs to arrest and return Morgan to their estate in Maryland. In a ruling on May 22, 1839, the Court of Quarter Sessions of York County convicted him of violation of the state law.

Prigg appealed to the US Supreme Court on the grounds that the Pennsylvania law was not able to supersede federal law or the US Constitution; the Fugitive Slave Act and Article IV of the Constitution were in conflict with the Pennsylvania law of 1788. The case was Prigg v. Pennsylvania, 41 U. S. 539 (1842).

Prigg and his lawyer argued that the 1788 and 1826 Pennsylvania laws were unconstitutional:

- First, because of the injunction in Article IV of the US Constitution: "No person held to service or labor in one state, under the laws thereof, escaping into another, shall, in consequence of any law or regulation therein, be discharged from such service or labor; but shall be delivered up, on claim of the party to whom such service or labor may be due."
- Second, because the exercise of Federal legislation, such as that undertaken by Congress in passing the act of the February 12, 1793, supersedes any state law.

As a consequence, they argued, the 1788 Pennsylvania law, in all its provisions applicable to this case, should be voided. The question was whether Pennsylvania law violated the Fugitive Slave Clause and the 1793 Fugitive Slave Act.

== Decision ==
Writing for the Court, Justice Joseph Story reversed the conviction and held the Pennsylvania law was unconstitutional, as it denied both the right of slaveholders to recover their slaves under Article IV and the Federal Fugitive Slave Law of 1793, which trumped the state law per the Supremacy Clause. Six justices wrote separate opinions.

Although Story ruled the Pennsylvania laws were unconstitutional, his opinion left the door open for the state to forbid state officials to cooperate in the return of fugitive slaves:

As to the authority so conferred upon state magistrates [to deal with runaway slaves], while a difference of opinion has existed, and may exist still on the point, in different states, whether state magistrates are bound to act under it; none is entertained by this Court that state magistrates may, if they choose, exercise that authority, unless prohibited by state legislation.

However, state laws could not interfere with a slave-owner's right to go to another state and seize fugitive slaves by private action, as long as no breach of the peace was committed.

Five of the seven Supreme Court justices (including Story) referred to the commonly held view at the time that the Southern states in the Constitutional Convention of 1787 would not have agreed to the U.S. Constitution if the Fugitive Slave Clause had not been included. Since then historians such as Don E. Fehrenbacher have argued that there is little historical evidence for this.

== Dissent ==
Justice John McLean was the sole dissenter in the case. He pointed out that the 1793 Fugitive Slave Act required anyone seizing a fugitive slave in a different state to take them before a federal judge or local magistrate to receive certification that the seizure was legal. Prigg had not done this before removing Morgan and her children from Pennsylvania. Therefore, he saw no conflict between Pennsylvania's laws criminalizing the forcible removal of blacks from the state and the 1793 law, which required bringing defendants before a judge or magistrate before removing them from the state. In McLean's view, Congress possessed the authority for enforcing the Fugitive Slave Clause, and they had used this authority to allow for the rendition of fugitive slaves from free states only with the approval of a judge or magistrate. By failing to use this method, Prigg had exceeded any authority he could possibly claim for the rendition of fugitive slaves, and Pennsylvania's laws were consistent with the constitution and the 1793 law in holding him accountable.

McLean felt Pennsylvania's laws against forced removal were particularly important for preventing free blacks from being wrongfully enslaved, as without them, slave catchers could easily kidnap free blacks and remove them from a state's jurisdiction before said state could investigate or arrest them.

== Effects ==
Story's phrase "unless prohibited by state legislation" was a catalyst for a number of personal liberty laws enacted by Pennsylvania and other Northern states. The laws prohibited state officials from enforcing the Fugitive Slave Clause. Runaways could not be caught or incarcerated by state action, cases could not be heard in state courts, and no assistance could be offered by state officials to those wishing to recapture slaves. The Fugitive Slave Act still stood, but its enforcement was left to the federal government in these cases.

Such an emphatic refusal to uphold the Fugitive Slave Act was viewed in the Southern states as a brazen violation of the federal compact. A constituent complained by letter to South Carolina Senator John C. Calhoun that the new personal liberty laws "rendered slave property utterly insecure" and constituted a "flagrant violation of the spirit of the U.S. Constitution".

Increasing sectional tension over slavery resulted in the Compromise of 1850, which covered several issues related to the status of territories acquired in the Mexican–American War. The South allowed California to enter the Union as a free state, but the Northern states would have to agree to a strengthened Fugitive Slave Act, which required law enforcement in free states to cooperate in the capture and rendition of fugitive slaves within their borders.

The South had been forced to look to the federal government for a national solution. The Supreme Court had pledged itself in advance to support such a solution although aware that many persons in the North would certainly be mobilized against it. In addition, people began to believe that the Court was uniquely qualified to soothe the growing agitation over slavery.

However, the Liberty Party platform of 1843 (which was adopted in advance of the 1844 presidential election) condemned the Prigg v. Pennsylvania decision and said that the ruling nullified habeas corpus protection for free blacks and took away their "whole legal security of personal freedom."

== See also ==
- List of United States Supreme Court cases, volume 41
- American slave court cases
- Freedom suits
- Ableman v. Booth – case related to Fugitive Slave Act of 1850
- Dred Scott v. Sandford – freedom suit
- Printz v. United States – similar case on federal laws commandeering state and local law enforcement
