= Swift v. Tyson =

- Supreme Court of the United States

Decided January 25, 1842
- Full case name: John Swift v. George W. Tyson
- Citations: 41 U.S. 1 (more) 16 Pet. 1; 10 L. Ed. 865; 1842 U.S. LEXIS 345

Case history
- Prior: On a certificate of division from the Circuit Court of the United States for the Southern District of New York

Holding
- Federal courts were to apply state statutory law, but not common law, to state cases.

Court membership
- Chief Justice Roger B. Taney Associate Justices Joseph Story · Smith Thompson; John McLean · Henry Baldwin; James M. Wayne · John Catron; John McKinley · Peter V. Daniel

Case opinions
- Majority: Story, joined by unanimous
- Concur/dissent: Catron
- Overruled by
- Erie Railroad Co. v. Tompkins (1938).

Swift v. Tyson, 41 U.S. (16 Pet.) 1 (1842), was a case brought in diversity in the Circuit Court for the Southern District of New York on a bill of exchange accepted in New York in which the Supreme Court of the United States determined that United States federal courts that heard cases brought under their diversity jurisdiction under the Judiciary Act of 1789 must apply statutory state laws when the state legislatures in question had spoken on the issue, but did not have to apply the state's common law if the state legislatures had not spoken on the issue.

The ruling meant that the federal courts that decided matters not specifically addressed by the state legislature had the authority to develop a federal general common law.

In 1938, this decision was overruled by Erie Railroad Co. v. Tompkins, which dispensed with the concept of federal general common law in the United States.

== Statute ==
Section 34 of the Judiciary Act of 1789 states that "the laws of the several states, except where the constitution, treaties or statutes of the United States shall otherwise recognise or provide, shall be regarded as rules of decision in trials at common law, in the courts of the United States, in cases where they apply."

== Decision ==
The Court decided that a bona fide holder of a negotiable instrument for valuable consideration, without any notice of the facts that implicate its validity as between the antecedent parties, if he takes it under an endorsement made before the same becomes due, holds the title unaffected by those facts and may recover thereon although, as between the antecedent parties, the transaction may be without any legal validity.

It decided that Section 34 of the Judiciary Act of 1789 does not restrict federal courts hearing diversity of citizenship cases from deriving their "own" common law.

It sustained the determination of the lower federal court that under the general common law (with reference to general principles of commercial jurisprudence), a pre-existing debt constitutes a valuable consideration for a negotiable instrument.

== Reasoning ==
Common law is not strictly local; court decisions aspire towards true interpretations, which are to be sought not in the decisions themselves but in general principles and doctrines. Court decisions do not constitute laws or authority as to what the law is but only evidence of what the law is.

Strictly local law consists of the state's positive statutes, constructions thereof adopted by state courts, and rights and titles to things having a permanent locality, such as to real estate and other matters immovable and intraterritorial in their nature and character.

The "common" law—which is not local—includes the rights and titles created in contracts or other instruments of a commercial nature, which are to be sought in general principles of commercial jurisprudence.

In Section 34 of the Judiciary Act of 1789, "the laws of the several states" referred to state laws that were strictly local and so not to a state's "common" law. Thus, it did not bind federal courts to state commercial jurisprudence. The Federal jurisdiction is free to interpret the general common law.

The Supreme Court, therefore, sustained the determination of the lower federal court that under the general common law, a pre-existing debt constitutes a valuable consideration for a negotiable instrument.

The doctrine from Swift v. Tyson was followed for many years and expanded over time, but the Supreme Court rarely justified it further. Courts applied the doctrine inconsistently, so it was not easy to predict what, exactly, a particular federal judge would hold to be the general law of the land. Nonetheless, the Supreme Court revisited the doctrine in Baltimore & Ohio Railroad Co. v. Baugh and not only upheld Swift but provided reasons that the doctrine ought to continue. In dissent, Justice Field declared that Swift had been wrongly decided at the time. By the time Swift was overruled, it was considered a superprecedent.

== See also ==
- Erie Doctrine
