= Federal common law =

U.S. law term for common law developed by federal, rather than state, courts

Federal common law is a term of United States law used to describe common law that is developed by the federal courts, instead of by the courts of the various states. Ever since Louis Brandeis, writing for the Supreme Court of the United States in Erie Railroad v. Tompkins (1938), overturned Joseph Story's decision in Swift v. Tyson, federal courts exercising diversity jurisdiction have applied state law as the substantive laws, with few exceptions. Nevertheless, there are several areas where federal common law continues to govern.

== History ==
=== Origins ===
During the era when the Constitution was written, it was understood that common law was alterable by legislatures. For example, Alexander Hamilton emphasized in The Federalist Papers that the New York Constitution made the common law subject "to such alterations and provisions as the legislature shall from time to time make concerning the same." Thus, even when a federal court has authority to make common law, that law is subject to alteration by Congress. This principle finds expression in the first sentence of the Constitution: "All legislative Powers herein granted shall be vested in a Congress of the United States, which shall consist of a Senate and House of Representatives."

=== The Swift doctrine ===
Until 1938, federal courts in the United States followed the doctrine set forth in the 1842 case of Swift v. Tyson. In that case, the U.S. Supreme Court held that federal courts hearing cases brought under their diversity jurisdiction, allowing them to hear cases between parties from different U.S. states, had to apply the statutory law of the states, but not the common law developed by state courts. Instead, the Supreme Court permitted the federal courts to make their own common law based on general principles of law.

The reasoning behind the decision in Swift v. Tyson was that the federal courts would craft a superior common law, and the state courts would voluntarily choose to adopt it. This hope was not fulfilled, however, as the principles of the common law of the several states continued to dramatically diverge in subsequent decades. Many litigants began to engage in forum shopping: abusing the availability of the federal courts for the specific purpose of having cases decided under federal common law, in lieu of state common law.

=== The Erie doctrine ===
In 1938, the Supreme Court decided Erie Railroad v. Tompkins. Erie overruled Swift v. Tyson, holding instead that federal courts exercising diversity jurisdiction had to use all of the same substantive laws as the courts of the states in which they were located. As the Erie Court put it, there is no "federal general common law", with the operative word being "general".

The Erie decision did not put an end to other types of federal common law. Several areas of federal common law remain, in two basic categories: areas where Congress has given the courts power to develop substantive law, and areas where a federal rule of decision is necessary to protect uniquely federal interests.

The U.S. Congress has given courts power to formulate common law rules in areas such as admiralty law, antitrust, bankruptcy law, interstate commerce, and civil rights. Congress often lays down broad mandates with vague standards, which are then left to the courts to interpret, and these interpretations eventually give rise to complex understandings of the original intent of Congress, informed by the courts' understanding of what is just and reasonable.

Furthermore, in the 1943 case of Clearfield Trust Co. v. United States, the Court recognized that federal courts could still create federal common law, albeit in limited circumstances where federal or Constitutional interests were at stake, Congress had inadequately addressed the situation sub judice, and the application of individual state laws in various jurisdictions would create unacceptable levels of diversity or uncertainty. When fashioning new federal common law, the Court may either adopt a reasonable state law, look to its own precedent, or create new law.

=== Congressional repeal of federal common law ===
Federal common law is valid only to the extent that Congress has not repealed the common law. The Supreme Court has explained that, "when Congress addresses a question previously governed by a decision resting on federal common law, the need for such an unusual exercise of law-making by federal courts disappears."

== Federal criminal common law ==
Statutes enacted by the deliberative legislative process are the preferred source of American criminal law. Modern American criminal law reflects a variety of sources; some crimes existed at common law, while others that address modern problems like computer crimes are new. The Constitution prohibits ex post facto laws for states in Article I §10, the same as it does for Congress in §9, but there is no constitutional provision that outright prohibits courts from defining common law offenses. In Federal jurisdiction, the Supreme Court decision in United States v. Hudson (1812) held that federal courts had no jurisdiction to define new common law crimes. For federal crimes, there must always be a (constitutionally valid) statute defining the offense, jurisdiction of federal courts and the penalties. Although there is no Supreme Court decision prohibiting state courts from defining common law offenses, they have been rare, and the Model Penal Code and most states have abolished common law offenses. In a minority of states a reception statute may recognize the common law offenses that existed at the time the statute was enacted as punishable.
