= Judiciary Act 1903 =

Act of the Parliament of Australia

Parliament of Australia
- Long title: An Act to make provision for the Exercise of the Judicial Power of the Commonwealth
- Citation: No. 6, 1903 as amended or No. 6 of 1903
- Territorial extent: States and territories of Australia
- Royal assent: 25 August 1903
- Commenced: 25 August 1903
- Status: Current legislation

The Judiciary Act 1903 (Cth) is an Act of the Parliament of Australia that regulates the structure of the Australian judicial system and confers jurisdiction on Australian federal courts. It is one of the oldest pieces of Australian federal legislation and has been amended over 70 times.

Amongst other things, the Act regulates the exercise of the jurisdiction of the High Court of Australia, confers jurisdiction on the Federal Court of Australia, provides for the right of barristers and solicitors to practice in federal courts, and establishes the Australian Government Solicitor.

== The Act ==
Section 78B of the Act requires Australian courts to ensure that the parties have given notice to the attorneys-general of Australia and of each state before proceeding with any case involving a "matter arising under the Constitution." Each of these governments may then intervene in the case under section 78A of the Act.

Section 78 and 79 of the Act govern the application of state law by Australian federal courts. The two sections borrow verbiage from the American Rules of Decision Act.

== See also ==
- Australia Act 1986
