= Fiscal federalism =

Subfield of public economics

As a subfield of public economics, fiscal federalism is concerned with "understanding which functions and instruments are best centralized and which are best placed in the sphere of decentralized levels of government" (Oates, 1999). In other words, it is the study of how competencies (expenditure side) and fiscal instruments (revenue side) are allocated across different (vertical) layers of the administration. An important part of its subject matter is the system of transfer payments or grants by which a central government shares its revenues with lower levels of government.

Federal governments use this power to enforce national rules and standards. There are two primary types of transfers, conditional and unconditional. A conditional transfer from a federal body to a province, or other territory, involves a certain set of conditions. If the lower level of government is to receive this type of transfer, it must agree to the spending instructions of the federal government. An example of this would be the Canada Health Transfer. An unconditional grant is usually a cash or tax point transfer, with no spending instructions. An example of this would be a federal equalization transfer.

In 2017, Governor of Rivers State of Nigeria, Ezenwo Nyesom Wike said that he believes true fiscal federalism will "strengthen the economy of his country as all sections will develop based on their comparative advantages". These questions arise: (a) how are federal and non-federal countries different with respect to 'fiscal federalism' or 'fiscal decentralization', and (b) how are fiscal federalism and fiscal decentralization related (similar or different)?

== Main concepts ==
The concepts of fiscal federalism are related to vertical and horizontal fiscal relations. The notions related to horizontal fiscal relations are related to regional imbalances and horizontal competition. Similarly the notions related to fiscal relations are related to vertical fiscal asymmetry (VFA) between the two senior levels of government, that is the centre and the states/provinces. While the concept of horizontal fiscal imbalance is relatively non controversial (as explained above), there is a lively debate around the concepts of vertical fiscal imbalance and vertical fiscal gap (see Boadway 2002 Bird 2003).

Many public policy experts prefer the notion of "vertical fiscal asymmetry" —coined and conceptualised by Sharma (2011)—over its alternative "vertical fiscal imbalance" because the former is relatively neutral and highlights the unfeasibility of a balance or symmetry purporting to eliminate any kind of vertical fiscal asymmetry. VFA acknowledges the inherent challenges in achieving a perfect balance or symmetry in fiscal relations between different levels of government. This concept recognizes that a certain degree of asymmetry is an unavoidable and realistic aspect of fiscal federalism.

The term VFI often carries a negative connotation. It suggests a deviation from an ideal state of fiscal balance, which might not be practically achievable or even desirable in a federal system. The use of VFA, therefore, avoids these implications and focuses more on the pragmatic aspects of fiscal federalism. Moreover, the terminology of VFA is thought to implicitly support the devolution of funds to subnational governments. On the other hand, the term VFI is sometimes interpreted as opposing intergovernmental transfers. Therefore, the concept of VFA offers a more nuanced framework for understanding the dynamics of fiscal federalism.

== Local, national and international public goods ==
Various activities of the government are undertaken at different levels. To understand the assignment of responsibilities to the different levels of state, it can be beneficial to define, whether it is more useful to deal with problems at the local or the federal level. Public goods in general are goods that are neither excludable nor rival. For that reason, they are usually provided by the government. For some kind of goods, the benefits accrue to residents of a particular area or community. These are called local public goods. Examples of them are traffic lights or fire protection. In contrast, for national public goods, there is a presumption for federal provision, because their benefits accrue to everyone in the nation. An example is national defense. There are also some public goods, from which benefit people living all over the world. These are called international public goods, e.g. global environment.

To be the supply of public goods efficient, national public goods must be supplied at national level, local public goods at local level, etc. If the provision of national public goods is left to local communities, there would be a freerider problem and there can occur an undersupply of those goods. Similarly, there is likely to be an undersupply of international public goods, if they are provided by the national governments. However, it does not exist any highest level of the government, which stands above national governments, which would be given responsibility for resolving global externality problems. The closest approximation to a global government is probably the United Nations General Assembly.

On the other hand, it is beneficial, when local public goods are provided by local governments and not national. Charles Tiebout of the University of Washington argued that competition among communities ensures efficiency in the supply of local public goods, like it does a competition among private subjects in the supply of private goods. Competition between communities arises naturally, because if the citizens of the community do not like, how the public goods are provided to them, they can move to the other community, where they think the provision of public goods is better. Moving from one town to another is naturally much easier than moving to a different country. This argument is called Tiebout hypothesis.

The provision of local public goods by local governments is not always optimal and sometimes federal intervention may be required. The question of which activities should take place at which level of government is called optimal fiscal federalism. Reasons, why federal government might intervenes to the provision of public local goods include market failures and redistribution. Market failures occur because actions of one community have effects on the others (externalities) and similarly as in the market with private goods, competition is not perfect, because there is always a limited number of communities. The problem of redistribution is that with free migration and local competition communities will not redistribute income (to individuals or between communities) or, at most, the redistribution will be limited. From this reason, redistribution is performed by the higher levels of government.

== Grants ==
Federal government redistributes the income to lower levels of government using tools that are called grants. It does so because of several reasons. Local governments have often better information about preferences of local people and costs. Another reason is that the federal government may try to offer states and localities incentives to undertake additional spending, from which will benefit also neighboring communities or the whole country.

The composition of federal grants in the US has changed significantly over the past 50 years. Nowadays, federal grants for health programs represent 65 percent of the total amount of money distributed by federal grants, compared with less than 20 percent in 1980.

There are two main types of federal grants. A matching grant is a grant, which ties the amount of funds provided by the higher level of government to the local community to the amount of spending by the local community. The local state determines the level of expenditure and federal government pays a certain part of the amount. For example, one-for-one matching grant for some specific purpose would provide $1 of funding from a higher level for each $1 paid by lower level. In comparison, when the government provides a block grant, the amount of money paid by government is given and every cost above this number is paid by the local level government. Block grants can be also provided being tied up to any specific use. A grant of some fixed amount with a mandate that money be spent only on some specific purpose is called conditional block grant. In general, grants that are restricted to a particular way of use are called categorical grants.

Matching grants are more effective in encouraging expenditures for specific purpose. They effectively lower the price of certain local public goods. This change pivots the budget constraint outwards. As a result of both income and substitution effect spending on those goods increases. Matching grants have distortionary effect, which means that same utility level as provide these grants can be attained at lower cost with block grants. When a community is offered an unconditional block grant, a lump-sum transfer shifts the budget constraint outwards. Conditional block grants have effects much like a lump sum grant - it makes no difference whether it is given, what should the additional money be used for, so long as the amount of money provided is less than the total desired expenditure. This means that the effect of a conditional block grant will be different from that of an unconditional block grant only if the funded local community would have spent less than the amount of grant without the mandate on how it is to be spent. However, this theory, which says that it does not matter, whether there is a condition or not, might not always be true. Some empirical evidence indicates the presence of a so called "flypaper effect", which says that the grant leads to significantly greater spending on the desired local public goods.

== Fiscal Federalism Network ==
The relationship between central and subcentral government bodies has a profound effect on efficiency and equity within the government and on macroeconomic stability of the country. The role of the OECD Network on Fiscal Relations Across Levels of Government, part of its Centre for Tax Policy and Administration, is to provide data and analysis on these relationships between organizations at different levels of government.

== See also ==
- Fiscal imbalance
- Fiscal union
- Full fiscal autonomy for Scotland
- New Federalism

== Bibliography ==
- Ferrara, A. (2010) Cost-Benefit Analysis of Multi-Level Government: The Case of EU Cohesion Policy and US Federal Investment Policies, London and New York: Routledge.
- Groenendijk, Nico. 2002. 'Fiscal federalism Revisited' paper presented at Institutions in Transition Conference organized by IMAD, Slovenia Ljublijana.
- King, David. 1984. Fiscal Tiers: The Economics of Multilevel Government, London: George Allen and Unwin.
- Oates, W.E. 1999. 'An Essay on Fiscal federalism', Journal of economic Literature, 37(3):1120-49 JSTOR.
- Bahl, R., & Bird, R. 2008. Subnational taxes in developing countries: The way forward. Public Budgeting & Finance, 28(4), 1-25.
- Faguet, J.P. and C. Poschl 2015. Is Decentralization Good for Development? Perspectives from Academics and Policymakers. Oxford: Oxford University Press.
- Stiglitz, Joseph E. (1999). Economics of the public sector. New York, London: W.W. Norton & Company. pp. 733–734. ISBN 0-393-96651-8.
- Hillman, Arye L. (2009). Public Finance and Public Policy. (Second edition ed.). New York: Cambridge University Press. p. 728. ISBN 978-0-521-49426-7.
- Gruber, Jonathan (2012). Public Finance and Public Policy.(fourth edition ed.). New York: Worth Publishers. p. 269-271. ISBN ISBN 978-1-4292-7845-4
- Kadochnikov, Denis V. (2019) Fiscal decentralization and regional budgets’ changing roles: a comparative case study of Russia and China, Area Development and Policy, DOI: 10.1080/23792949.2019.1705171
