= Canadian transfer payments =

Payments by Canadian government to provinces

Transfer payments are a collection of payments made by the Government of Canada to Canadian provinces and territories under the Federal–Provincial Arrangements Act. Chief among these are the Canada Social Transfer, the Canada Health Transfer and equalization payments. The last of these can be spent however the receiving provinces see fit, while the first two are intended to support social and health services respectively.

While the territories do not participate in the equalization payment program (the Territorial Formula Financing program taking its place), they do participate in the health and social transfers.

== Total federal transfers ==
The Canadian federal government announced in 2023-24, $94.6 billion to transfer to the provinces and territories through major transfers (Canada Health Transfer, Canada Social Transfer, Equalization and Territorial Formula Financing), direct targeted support and trust funds), a $7 billion increase from the previous year, 2022-23.

== Canada Health Transfer ==
Unlike Equalization payments, which can be spent however the receiving provinces sees fit, the funds received as part of the Canada Health Transfer must be used by provinces and territories for the purposes of "maintaining the national criteria" for publicly provided health care in Canada as set out in the Canada Health Act.

The Canada Health Transfer is made up of a cash transfer and tax transfer. In 2016-17, cash transfer payments from the federal government to the provinces and territories were $36.1 billion and tax point transfers were worth -$4.3 billion. The Canadian Health Transfer increases in line with a three-year moving average of nominal GDP growth, with funding guaranteed to increase by at least 3.0 per cent per year.

While the transfer is allocated on an equal per capita basis, the cash component is not because it takes into account the value of provincial/territorial tax points. The value of a tax point represents the amount of revenue that is generated by one percentage point of a particular tax (in the case of the Canada Health Transfer and the Canada Social Transfer, the personal income tax or the corporate income tax). Since provinces do not have identical economies and, therefore, have unequal capacity to raise tax revenues, a tax point is worth more in a wealthy province than in a poorer province.

== Canada Social Transfer ==
The Canada Social Transfer is the Canadian government's transfer payment programme in support of post-secondary education, social assistance and social services, including early childhood development and early learning and childcare. It was made independent from the Canada Health and Social Transfer programme on April 1, 2004 to allow for greater accountability and transparency for federal health funding. In the 2017/18 fiscal year, the Canada Social Transfer was projected to be $13.7 billion. The Canada Social Transfer is legislated to grow at 3.0 per cent per year.

== Equalization payments ==
In Canada, the federal government makes payments to less wealthy Canadian provinces to equalize the provinces' "fiscal capacity" — their ability to generate tax revenues. The program began in 1957. In 2016-2017, six provinces will receive $17.9 billion in equalization payments from the federal government. Until the 2009–2010 fiscal year, Ontario was the only province to have never received equalization payments; in 2009-2010 Ontario received 347 million dollars, while Newfoundland, which has received payments since the program's creation, is now a so-called "have" province, and is now a net contributor and does not receive payments.

Canada's territories are not included in the equalization program – the federal government addresses territorial fiscal needs through the Territorial Formula Financing program.

Equalization payments are based on a formula that calculates the difference between the per capita revenue yield that a particular province would obtain using average tax rates and the national average per capita revenue yield at average tax rates. The current formula considers five major revenue sources (see below). The objective of the program is to ensure that all provinces have access to per capita revenues equal to the potential average of all ten provinces. The formula is based solely on revenues and does not consider the cost of providing services or the expenditure need of the provinces.

Equalization payments do not involve wealthy provinces making direct payments to poor provinces as the money comes from the federal treasury. As an example, a wealthy citizen in Quebec, a so-called "have not" province, pays more tax into the federal system and funds more equalization than a poorer citizen in Alberta that pays less federal tax, a so-called "have" province. However, because of Alberta's wealth, the citizens of Alberta as a whole are net contributors to equalization, while the government of New Brunswick, therefore the citizens, are net receivers of equalization payments.

Equalization payments are one example of what are often collectively referred to in Canada as "transfer payments", a term used in other jurisdictions to refer to cash payments to individuals. Unlike conditional transfer payments such as the Canada Health Transfer or the Canada Social Transfer, the money the provinces receive through equalization can be spent in any way the provincial government desires. The payments are meant to guarantee "reasonably comparable levels" of health care, education, and welfare in all the provinces. The definition of "reasonably comparable levels", however, has been the subject of considerable debate.

In 2016–2017, the total amount of the program was roughly 17.9 billion Canadian dollars.

Traditionally, the payments have been seen as a way of promoting national unity. In addition, the ebb and flow of receiving or paying into equalization by the various provinces has moderated both recession and growth periods within individual provincial economies, which has increased long-term stability in the Canadian economy as a whole. Only a very small amount of Canadian government revenue is put into equalization; for 2009, it was slightly over 2%, at 13.6 billion out of 633.6 billion total revenue Canadian dollars.

== See also ==
- Transfer payment
