= Declaration (law) =

Authoritative establishment of fact by a court of law

In law, a declaration is an authoritative establishment of fact. Declarations take various forms in different legal systems.

== Canon law ==
In the canon law of the Catholic Church, a declaration of nullity, (commonly called an annulment and less commonly a decree of nullity) is authoritative judgment on the part of an ecclesiastical tribunal juridically establishing the fact that a marriage was invalidly contracted or, less frequently, a judgment juridically establishing the fact that an ordination was invalidly conferred. It does not dissolve a valid bond of marriage, but it is merely a factual declaration of the nullity of the bond.

== Common law ==
In common law, a declaration ordinarily refers to a judgment of the court or an award of an arbitration tribunal that is a binding adjudication of the rights or other legal relations of the parties which does not provide for or order enforcement. Where the declaration is made by a court, it is usually referred to as a declaratory judgment. Less commonly, where declaratory relief is awarded by an arbitrator, it is normally called a declaratory award.

Declaratory relief is most commonly seen in two particular circumstances:

1. applications for declarations of legitimacy, in family and probate legal proceedings; and
2. under insurance policies, for a determination of whether a peril is covered by a particular policy.

== European Union law ==
Applications for declaratory relief in other areas have become more widespread, particularly in Europe. A key feature in relation to this development has been the Brussels and Lugano Conventions on civil jurisdiction and judgments relating to members of the European Economic Area (EEA). In certain circumstances, jurisdiction is awarded under the conventions to the courts first seised of the matter. This has led to a rise in defendants taking pre-emptive action by seeking "declarations of non-liability" in a race to the courthouse to ensure that they choose the court first seized rather than waiting for the claimant to do so.

== Declaratory legislation ==
An act of parliament or other statute is declaratory if it purports to state authoritatively what is the current state of affairs. By contrast, most statutes are positive law, purporting to order a future state of affairs. In linguistic terms, declaratory legislation is indicative whereas positive law is performative. Two acts of the Parliament of Great Britain asserting its right to legislate for other jurisdictions are commonly called "the Declaratory Act": one in 1719 relating to the Kingdom of Ireland, and another in 1766 relating to the Thirteen Colonies. The "Declaratory Articles" of the Church of Scotland likewise mean to define a status that already existed.

== Other legal uses ==
Declaration is used (sometimes rendered as a verb) in other ways in certain legal systems.

- In some legal systems, an unsworn declaration under penalty of perjury may be used in lieu of an affidavit to submit a witness's written testimony to a court.
- In relation to companies, declaration is the first step in relation to distribution and payment of dividends.
- In trust law, a settlor who declares that he holds certain property on trust is said to make a declaration of trust.
- Dying declarations are an exception to the rule against hearsay in many legal systems.
- Declarations against interest are also an exception to the rule against hearsay in many legal systems.
- A formal declaration of default is required to enforce creditors' security rights in some legal systems.
- An interpretative declaration is a formal note made by a state upon ratifying a treaty clarifying the state's interpretation of the treaty.
