= Jurisdictional arbitrage =

Practice of taking advantage of discrepancies between legal jurisdictions

Jurisdictional arbitrage is the practice of taking advantage of discrepancies between competing legal jurisdictions. It takes its name from arbitrage, the practice in finance of purchasing a good at a lower price in one market and selling it at a higher price in another. Just as in financial arbitrage, the attractiveness of jurisdiction arbitrage depends largely on its transaction costs, here the costs of switching legal service providers from one government to another.

The lower the exit costs for leaving the jurisdiction (unrestricted emigration, cheap travel, liquidity of assets) the more desirable and feasible it is. Conversely, high entry costs into the more favourable jurisdiction are an inhibitor on jurisdictional arbitrage; certain tax havens such as Andorra grant permanent residency rights to immigrants only if they meet certain criteria. Jurisdictional arbitrage is a significant concept in modern free market anarcho-capitalism.

== Applications ==
The practice of individuals seeking asylum involves appealing to a jurisdiction with favorable individual rights for residency, where the individual's native jurisdiction is seen by them to offer insufficient protection. For example, women have fled West African nations which practice tribal female genital mutilation and/or extremist Islam in favour of European and North American jurisdictions. In July 2019, one of the wives--Princess Haya--of the ruler of Dubai was in a London courtroom to ask the state to provide and enforce a non-molestation order for her and what is known as a forced marriage protection order for their daughters; otherwise the women would be forced to submit to the Sharia law jurisdiction of Sheikh Mohammed.

=== Outlawry ===
Jurisdictional arbitrage has also been utilized to hinder attempts at governmental prosecution, by transnational criminals such as terrorists, money launderers, and cyber-attackers. Prior to recent international mobilization against the practice, there existed a long-standing tradition of ousted state leaders such as Mohammed Reza Pahlevi, Idi Amin and Augusto Pinochet finding refuge and retirement abroad to avoid prosecution in their native jurisdiction. Pinochet, one-time military leader of Chile sought to evade retributive prosecution in his native jurisdiction by seeking refuge in the United Kingdom. He was later prosecuted by the Spanish court of Baltasar Garzón according to the principle of universal jurisdiction.

To counteract this phenomenon, most countries have signed bilateral extradition treaties with most other countries, and some governments adopted the principle of universal jurisdiction, which has enabled individuals to be prosecuted for offences (particularly alleged human rights violations and war crimes) committed outside the jurisdiction of prosecution – the legal structure of nations such as Belgium and Spain allow for this, as does that of international tribunals operating under the aegis of the United Nations.

=== Tax policy ===
A similar attempt at governmental collusion to limit the use of jurisdictional arbitrage for tax avoidance is the policy of tax harmonization. The membership of European governments in the European Union resulted in a collection of nations with a limited set of common legal structures (Four Freedoms) which has resulted in tax competition by the otherwise less-developed nations (such as Ireland in the early 1990s) whereby governments compete for foreign investment by lowering their tax rates significantly below those of their neighbours. This strategy has been adopted in the form of a flat tax by various Eastern European nations, which has resulted in calls for harmonization of tax rates by the traditionally more developed nations such as France, Britain and Germany.

=== Labour ===
In the view of one journalist, Microsoft's satellite office in Vancouver was set up because the US Immigration and Naturalization Service was given to restrict the immigration of programmers.

The Blueseed project intended to launch a ship 12 nautical miles from the shore (and thus in international waters) with the goal of allowing entrepreneurs without US work visas legally to work for and create companies close to Silicon Valley.

== Advocates ==
Jurisdictional arbitrage is a popular second-best strategy amongst anarchists who believe that it will allow them to avoid state control and persecution. In the 19th century, many persecuted European anarchists such as Mikhail Bakunin and Prince Peter Kropotkin sought refuge in London, which offered greater freedom of political expression than their native jurisdictions. Anarcho-capitalists hope that by subdividing existing governmental jurisdictions into city-states (such as Singapore), competition among jurisdictions for citizens will lead to a diversity of legal climates including more favourable jurisdictions for liberty and self-determination. Cypherpunks and crypto-anarchists also cite low exit costs and fluidity of movement across jurisdictions as a significant means of advancing individual freedom through the free movement of information and capital. The concept of seasteading is an attempt to increase the possibility of jurisdictional arbitrage by decreasing the cost of switching governments.

A notable proponent and practitioner of jurisdictional arbitrage is Canadian businessman and perpetual traveler Calvin Ayre, founder of online gambling consortium Bodog Entertainment Group. Although online gambling is illegal in the United States, a market which accounts for 95% of Bodog's sales, the company pays no corporate taxes there as its activities are distributed across different jurisdictions to minimise tax burden. "We run a business that can't actually be described as gambling in each country we operate in. But when you add it all together, it’s Internet gambling."

== See also ==
- Asylum shopping
- Flag of convenience
- Forum shopping
- Gaming the system
- Libel tourism
- Tax Competition
- Tiebout model
- Seasteading
- Anarchy in international relations
- Counter-economics
- Panarchy
- Polycentric law
- The Machinery of Freedom — seminal anarcho-capitalist literature detailing the privatisation of government functions
- Regulatory competition
