= Alberta budget =

Annual Act of the Legislative Assembly of Alberta

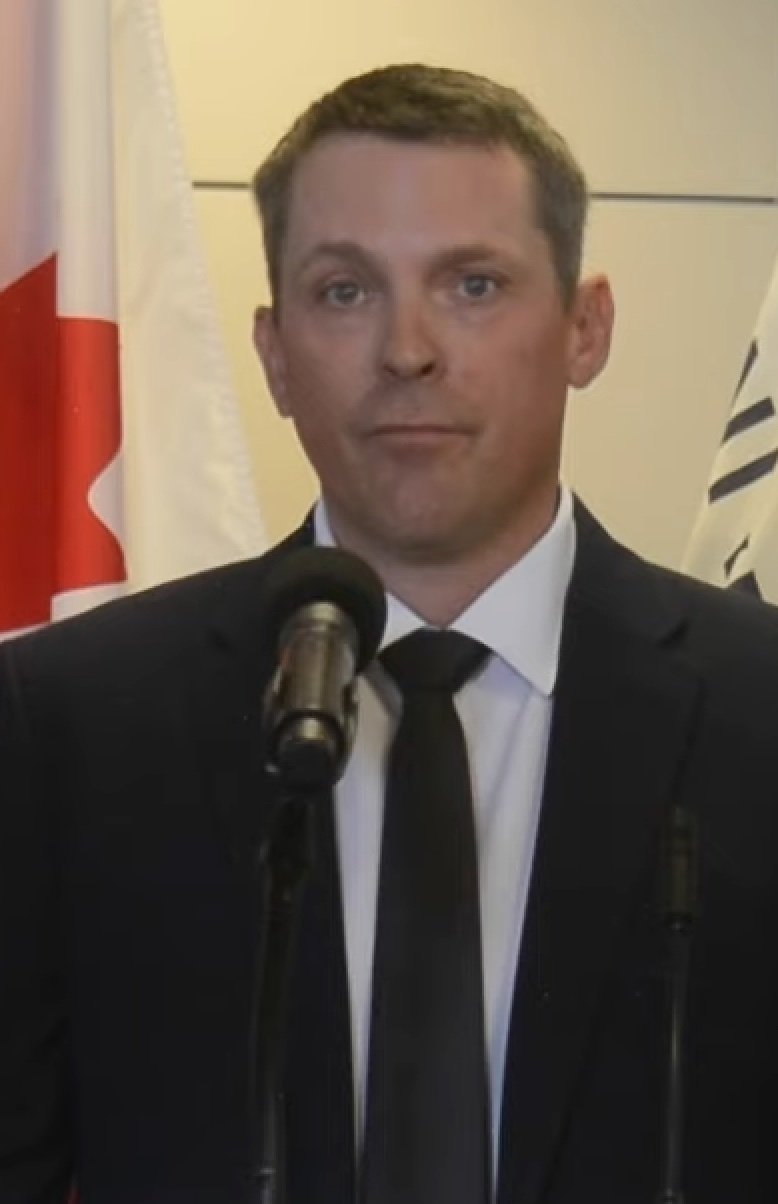
Current finance minister Nate Horner, since June 2023

The Alberta budget is an annual act of the Legislative Assembly of Alberta, giving statutory authority to the Government of Alberta for its revenue and expenditure plans. For the financial year 2024/25 the budget was approximately $73,170,000,000. The Financial Statutes Amendment Bill, is presented to the Legislative Assembly by the minister of finance. The current finance minister is Nate Horner, who was appointed to the role in June 2023.

== Purpose ==
The Government of Alberta is ultimately accountable to the members of the Legislative Assembly and to the Albertan public for its use of public money and how its spending is allocated. The Government of Alberta allocates funding for areas which include schools, hospitals, policing, certain social security benefits, the economy, climate change and the environment, amongst others, from the Alberta budget. The Alberta budget is primarily funded via provincial taxes and the Canadian transfer payments.

=== Alberta public finance ===
- Auditor General of Alberta
- Canadian transfer payments

== Historical budgets ==
Budgets of the Government of Alberta
Year (Note: Fiscal year is April 1 to March 31)	Date	Name	Bill	Minister of Finance		Budget (Billions CAD) (Note: Numbers across different fiscal years are not strictly comparable due to numerous accounting policy changes over time.) (Note: Totals may not add up due to rounding)					Actual (Billions CAD) (Note: Actual expenses taken from reporting in future year budgets or Annual Reports)				Notes
Year	Date	Name	Bill	Minister	Party	Revenue	Expenditure	Other (Provinsion/ Allowance)	Deficit	WTI (USD) (Note: West Texas Intermediate is used a benchmark in North America and serves as a reference price for buyers and sellers of crude oil)	Revenue	Expenditure	Deficit	WTI (USD)	Notes
2020	February 27, 2020	A plan for jobs and the economy		Travis Toews	UCP	50.0	56.1	-0.8	-6.8	58.00	43.1	60.1	-17.0	42.32	
2019	October 24, 2019	A plan for jobs and the economy		Travis Toews	UCP	50.0	56.5	-2.2	-8.7	57.00	46.2	58.4	-12.2	62.77	
2018	March 22, 2018	A recovery built to last		Joe Ceci	NDP	47.9	56.2	-0.5	-8.8	59.00	49.6	56.3	-6.7	53.69	
2017	March 16, 2017	Working to make life better		Joe Ceci	NDP	45.0	54.9	-0.5	-10.3	55.00	47.3	55.3	-8.0	53.69	
2016	April 14, 2016	The Alberta jobs plan		Joe Ceci	NDP	41.4	51.1	-0.7	-10.4	42.00	42.3	53.1	-10.8	47.93	
2015 (Note: The Progressive Conservative government under Premier Jim Prentice introduced a budget for the 2015-16 fiscal year prior to calling the 2015 Alberta general election. The New Democratic Party under Premier Rachel Notley introduced a new budget for the 2015-16 fiscal year upon forming government.)	October 27, 2015	Supporting jobs, supporting families. The Alberta way.		Joe Ceci	NDP	43.8	49.9		-6.1	50.00	42.5	48.9	-6.4	45.00	
2015	March 16, 2015	N/A		Robin Campbell	PC	43.4	48.4		-5.0	54.84	42.5	48.9	-6.4	45.00	
2014	March 6, 2014	The building Alberta plan		Doug Horner	PC	43.1	40.4		2.6	95.22	49.5	48.4	1.1	80.48	
2013	March 7, 2013	Responsible change		Doug Horner	PC	37.6	38.0	1.1	0.7	92.50	45.3	44.5	0.8	99.05	
2012	February 9, 2012	Investing in people		Ron Liepert	PC	40.3	41.1		-0.9	99.25	38.7	41.6	-2.8	92.07	
2011	February 24, 2011	Building a better Alberta		Lloyd Snelgrove	PC	35.6	39.0		-3.4	89.40	39.2	39.3	-0.02	97.33	
2010	February 9, 2010	Striking the right balance		Ted Morton	PC	34.0	38.7		-4.7	78.75	35.0	38.4	-3.4	83.38	

== Budget acts ==
- The Financial Administration Amendment Act, 1972 (Bill 91, assented to 1972-06-02), SA 1972, c 41
- The Financial Administration Amendment Act (No 2) (Bill 115, assented to 1972-11-22), SA 1972, c 108
- The Financial Administration Amendment Act, 1973 (Bill 56, assented to 1973-05-10), SA 1973, c 25
- The Financial Administration Amendment Act, 1974 (Bill 37, assented to 1974-06-06), SA 1974, c 28
- The Financial Administration Amendment Act, 1975 (Bill 23, assented to 1975-06-25), SA 1975(2), c 20
- The Financial Administration Amendment Act, 1976 (Bill 29, assented to 1976-05-19), SA 1976, c 19
- The Financial Administration Amendment Act, 1977 (Bill 23, assented to 1977-05-18), SA 1977, c 21
- The Financial Administration Act, 1977 (Bill 63, assented to 1977-11-10), SA 1977, c 68
- The Financial Administration Amendment Act, 1980 (Bill 31, assented to 1980-05-22), SA 1980, c 20
- Financial Administration Amendment Act, 1980 (No 2) (Bill 81, assented to 1980-11-27), SA 1980, c 64
- Financial Administration Amendment Act, 1982 (Bill 29, assented to 1982-05-04), SA 1982, c 18
- Financial Administration Amendment Act, 1983 (Bill 54, assented to 1983-06-06), SA 1983, c 29
- Financial Administration Amendment Act, 1984 (Bill 31, assented to 1984-05-31), SA 1984, c 18
- Financial Administration Amendment Act, 1986 (Bill 30, assented to 1986-09-18), SA 1986, c 16
- Financial Administration Amendment Act, 1987 (Bill 56, assented to 1987-06-17), SA 1987, c 22
- Financial Administration Amendment Act, 1989 (Bill 10, assented to 1989-08-18), SA 1989, c 14
- Financial Administration Amendment Act, 1990 (Bill 21, assented to 1990-05-30), SA 1990, c 20
- Financial Administration Amendment Act, 1991 (Bill 45, assented to 1991-06-25), SA 1991, c 12
- Financial Administration Amendment Act, 1992 (Bill 37, assented to 1992-07-08), SA 1992, c 15
- Financial Administration Amendment Act, 1993 (Bill 5, assented to 1993-10-14), SA 1993, c 19
- Agriculture Financial Services Act (Bill 21, assented to 1993-11-15), SA 1993, c A-12.5
- Financial Administration Amendment Act, 1996 (Bill 17, assented to 1996-05-01), SA 1996, c 18
- Financial Institutions Statutes Amendment Act, 1996 (Bill 21, assented to 1996-05-01), SA 1996, c 19
- Financial Administration Amendment Act, 1998 (Bill 39, assented to 1998-04-30), SA 1998, c 16
- Financial Statutes Amendment Act, 2003 (Bill 2, assented to 2003-03-10), SA 2003, c 2
- Financial Sector Statutes Amendment Act, 2003 (Bill 12, assented to 2003-05-16), SA 2003, c 19
- Financial Administration Amendment Act, 2004 (Bill 12, assented to 2004-03-11), SA 2004, c 7
- Financial Statutes Amendment Act, 2005 (Bill 37, assented to 2005-05-10), SA 2005, c 12
- Financial Institutions Statutes Amendment Act, 2008 (Bill 13, assented to 2008-06-03), SA 2008, c 4
- Financial Administration Amendment Act, 2008 (Bill 31, assented to 2008-11-04), SA 2008, c 16
- Financial Administration Amendment Act, 2013 (Bill 35, assented to 2013-12-11), SA 2013, c 20
- Financial Statutes Amendment Act, 2020 (Bill 44, assented to 2020-12-09), SA 2020, c 33
- Financial Statutes Amendment Act, 2022 (Bill 2, assented to 2022-04-21), SA 2022, c 4
- Financial Statutes Amendment Act, 2023 (Bill 10, assented to 2023-03-28), SA 2023, c 3
- Financial Statutes Amendment Act, 2024 (Bill 10, assented to 2024-05-16), SA 2024, c 4
- Financial Statutes Amendment Act, 2024 (No. 2) (Bill 32, assented to 2024-12-05), SA 2024, c 15

== See also ==
- Economy of Alberta
- Canadian federal budget
