= Regulator shopping =

Practice of choosing between regulators to get favourable regulatory conditions

Regulator shopping is the choosing of a government or state regulating agency or body that imposes on the choosing entity regulatory treatment more favorable than that which would be obtained from another regulating agency or body that also has the authority to regulate the choosing entity. Regulator shopping may be an example of a "race to the bottom" practice.

== United States examples ==
In the United States, private financial institutions that fall under the regulating authority of more than one regulatory agency are allowed to choose their regulator. American International Group (AIG) "shopped for" or chose as its non-insurance government regulator the federal Office of Thrift Supervision, possibly the most lax of all the federal bank regulators, imposing the weakest, most permissive regulations, by AIG purchasing a small savings and loan association.

In the U.S., at least one regulator has persuaded financial institutions to take steps to be regulated by it, instead of by another government regulator, by offering more favorable regulatory treatment. A government regulator may do so because it is funded by fees collected from firms that it regulates, and thus tries to recruit additional firms to come under its regulatory purview. For example, the Office of Thrift Supervision (OTC) pitched Countrywide Financial to choose it, and not the Office of the Comptroller of the Currency (OCC), to be Countrywide's regulator. Countrywide did so, and in this way Countrywide obtained the more lax regulations of the OTC and avoided the regulations of the OCC and, at the same time, OTC collected the regulatory fees levied on Countrywide.

Some members of the United States Congress have sponsored bills allowing for insurance companies to engage in regulator shopping, by choosing between state or federal insurance regulators.

== Chinese financial sector ==
Chinese banks also engage in regulator shopping and Beijing has had difficulty providing a uniform playing field throughout the country for all banking institutions.

== See also ==
- Forum shopping
- Jurisdictional arbitrage
