= Forum shopping =

Choice of lawsuit location based on plaintiff-friendly environment

Forum shopping, also known as venue shopping, is a colloquial term for the practice of litigants taking actions to have their legal case heard in the court they believe is most likely to provide a favorable judgment. Some jurisdictions have, for example, become known as "plaintiff-friendly" and thus have attracted plaintiffs to file new cases there, even if there is little or no connection between the legal issues and the jurisdiction.

The term became more widely used as a result of legal developments that expanded the number of available forums for litigants to bring cases, thus allowing litigants to effectively "shop" for the forum they believe will provide the best outcome. For example, in International Shoe Co. v. Washington (1945), the U.S. Supreme Court expanded the concept of personal jurisdiction to allow courts to hear disputes over defendants who had only 'minimum contacts' with its jurisdiction. Foreign litigants were also attracted to file suits in the United States due to a perception that it had a more favorable litigation climate. Other examples include the United Kingdom, which offers stricter defamation laws and generous divorce settlements.

The term "forum shopping" has taken on a negative connotation amongst some who view it as gamesmanship and manipulation that undermines the legitimacy of the judicial system, in order to obtain an unfair advantage. On the other side, some believe forum shopping is not inherently bad or evil, but merely the natural consequence of litigants being able to select from a number of potential forums to bring a case, and thus naturally selecting the forum they think will provide the most favorable outcome. For example, U.S. District Court Judge Sam B. Hall Jr., of the U.S. District Court for the Eastern District of Texas, stated in 1993 that "[i]in reality, every litigant who files a lawsuit engages in forum shopping when he chooses a place to file suit." The term has also become adopted in a wider context for the activity of repeatedly seeking a venue for a concern, complaint, or action, until the most favorable venue is obtained.

== Related notions ==
When a case is filed before a court, the court decides whether it has personal and subject matter jurisdiction, and if so, whether it is the most appropriate forum or venue. Under the doctrine of forum non conveniens, Latin for "inappropriate forum", a judge has a discretion to transfer a case if the court selected is not the most convenient one. If the courts in two states would accept civil jurisdiction, the plaintiff must be able to show that justice requires the trial to take place in the forum suggested by the plaintiff.

The plaintiff might have selected one forum on the following grounds:

- The forum is not convenient to the defendant or his witnesses. There may be problems of expense of travel, health, or visa or entry permit.
- The court, the judge, or the law is most likely to favour the plaintiff's case.

The defendant may take the following actions to seek a change of venue:

- The defendant may petition the forum court that it should reject the jurisdiction and petition to transfer the case to an allegedly more convenient forum; or
- If a case has been filed in another jurisdiction, the defendant may seek injunctive relief against the plaintiff in a second state, requiring that the plaintiff discontinue the action in the first forum and instead submit the case for hearing in this allegedly more convenient forum.

In both instances, the first step is to determine whether the first instance forum is the natural forum, or whether the forum has the closest connection with the action and the parties. The court adjudicates whether there is another forum that is more appropriate under the doctrine of comity. The current forum court must respect the right of a foreign court to assume jurisdiction. A court must balance the interests of the parties, since there is injustice not only when a plaintiff is allowed to pursue the action in a forum inconvenient to the defendant, but also when a plaintiff is not allowed a timely trial.

Generally, the court will not grant a petition to transfer or an injunction if the grant unjustly will deprive the plaintiff of advantages in the first instance forum. Nevertheless, a real and substantial connection between the venue and the cause(s) of action should exist to provide defendants some protection against being pursued in jurisdictions that have little or no connection with the transaction or the parties.

If the alternative court concludes that another court has assumed jurisdiction either without considering whether an alternative forum was available or has reached an obviously unreasonable conclusion on the merits, then an injunction would sometimes be a reasonable response. If, on the other hand, the alternative court has reasonably concluded that no more convenient forum was available, then comity requires it to respect the decision of the court that has already assumed jurisdiction and dismiss the application for an injunction and transfer. In cases where there is a sound argument to be made in favour of both courts, the court in the second venue should not arbitrarily claim a better right to decide for both jurisdictions. In most cases the adherence of the foreign court to principles resembling those applied in the second venue court will be obvious; if the foreign court has adhered, then the second venue court should refuse relief. International family lawyers work to assist their clients in that process.

== Child custody ==
In one case, a court expressly acknowledged that the plaintiff had chosen to move to the state in order to benefit from the liberal divorce laws in that state. The court found that was perfectly appropriate and did not justify a stay or dismissal of the case.

On the other hand, forum shopping is generally seen as particularly inappropriate when it is intended to secure a more sympathetic forum in a child custody case. Indeed, courts have found that the Hague Abduction Convention was designed to deter parents from engaging in international forum shopping in custody cases. Specifically, the Hague Convention attempts to prevent situations in which a parent dissatisfied with current custodial arrangements flees with the child to another country to re-litigate the merits of custody and to obtain a more favorable custody order.

Nonetheless, it may well be in the best interests of a child to remove the child from a forum which does not apply the best interests test in child custody cases to a forum which has a "better" law and practice in such cases.

"There is often a legal vacuum that encourages one parent to take children away from the other, and to deprive the children of access to the other parent," Morley says. "It not only hurts foreign parents if the Chinese partner takes the child to China, it also hurts Chinese parents living in China because if the other parent takes their child to a foreign country from China, the courts in that foreign country are unable to order the child's return to China under the terms of the convention."

== United States ==
The United States has attracted foreign litigants wishing to take advantage of the more generous awards of damages and alimony, extensive discovery rules, and the contingent fee system. In addition, the Foreign Trade Antitrust Improvements Act, the Alien Tort Claims Act, and many state product liability laws create legal rights that often do not exist in other jurisdictions.

=== By the plaintiff ===
A plaintiff frequently can choose to file his case in one of several jurisdictions by picking a federal rather than a local jurisdiction, a local rather than federal jurisdiction, or one of several geographic localities. A defendant in a civil case can be sued in a jurisdiction where the defendant resides, or where there are sufficient contacts between the cause of action and the jurisdiction. In the United States, the U.S. District Court for the Eastern District of Texas in Marshall, Texas, had become a popular forum for patent lawsuits, and cases filed there resolved favorably for the plaintiff 78% of the time; the national average was 59%. More recently, the U.S. District Court for the Western District of Texas in Waco, Texas, became an exceedingly popular forum for patent litigation. All patent infringement cases filed in Waco, Texas, were assigned to the same judge (Alan Albright), who attracted almost 25% of all patent infringement case filings in the United States as of 2022. This concentration of patent cases before a single judge and court led to rule changes in the U.S. District Court for the Western District of Texas, requiring that new patent infringement cases filed in Waco, Texas, be randomly assigned across the 12 judges in that district.

=== By the civil defendant ===
A defendant can resort to various procedures or theories to have a case removed from the court wherein the plaintiff originally filed it. The defendant may invoke the removal jurisdiction of a federal court to take a claim out of the state court, request for a change of venue because the case was brought in the improper or inconvenient court within the jurisdiction, and move for forum non conveniens on the ground that the case was brought in an inappropriate forum based on the locations of the parties or evidence.

=== In criminal cases ===
Forum shopping also happens, albeit less frequently, in U.S. federal criminal trials, especially as certain districts and circuits are widely thought to favor the government in particular issues or trials. It is often claimed that the trials of domestic and foreign terrorists in the United States were forum shopped. For example, John Allen Muhammad and Lee Boyd Malvo were arrested in Maryland in 2002 for a series of spree killings that occurred in Maryland, Washington, D.C., and Virginia, but U.S. Attorney General John Ashcroft chose to hand them over to Virginia for prosecutions, in part, because it was perceived Virginia was more likely impose a sentence of execution for Muhammad.

Criminal defendants have much less power to change the forum in which the case against them has been brought. Generally, they can do so only where they can show that localized notoriety or publicity makes it unlikely that an impartial jury can be selected in the district in which charges were brought.

=== Efforts to discourage forum shopping ===
While the plaintiff commencing the litigation is generally considered the master of their own complaint, courts may object to forum shopping for several reasons. The fair resolution of a case hinging on technical differences from one jurisdiction to the next would offend the sense of justice, and more practically, judges may fear that having the reputation of a forum favorable to certain types of plaintiffs will delay the timely dispensation of justice in other cases by increasing their workload.

Under the Erie doctrine, a federal court hearing a case under the diversity jurisdiction must apply the law of the state in which the court is sitting. When a case has connection to more than just a single state, the forum state's choice of law principles generally guide the selection of what place's law will apply.

Parties to a contract may seek to prevent forum shopping by inserting a forum selection clause or a choice of law clause in their contract. Such clauses are now generally enforced by the courts.

In June 2023, Illinois governor JB Pritzker signed a bill intended to discourage forum shopping by requiring that any lawsuits challenging the constitutionally of a state law be filed in one of two counties, either Sangamon County where the state capital of Springfield is located, or Cook County, the state's most populous county and home to multiple state offices in Chicago.

In March 2024, the Judicial Conference of the United States announced a policy against "judge shopping" for cases seeking a nationwide injunction or related relief. "Judge shopping" in this context refers to forum shopping in which a litigant files in a local division of a district court where one or two judges are assigned nearly all cases (such as the Amarillo division of the Northern District of Texas or the Waco division of the Western District of Texas) rather than in a larger division with multiple judges. Under the new policy, the Judicial Conference said that district courts should randomly assign any civil case seeking nationwide or statewide relief to any judge within the district. But the Judicial Conference policy is merely a recommendation and is not binding; on March 29, 2024, the Northern District of Texas, home to two judges frequently sought out by conservative litigants, announced that it would not adopt the Judicial Conference's recommendations.

== Bolivia ==
In Bolivia, the Guaraní have the option of using their indigenous law as an alternative to conventional law, a choice not available to non-Guaraní.

== Peru ==
The Peruvian rondas campesinas enable the rural population to access a traditional system of customary law as an alternative to ordinary Peruvian law.

== Philippines ==
Forum shopping is considered a serious offense which can be made by a complainant. The law in the Philippines explicitly prohibits the filing of more than one case for the same cause of action in any forum or court of law so that the courts will not be clogged by complaints of people who may file more than one complaint in an effort to gain a favorable decision in any of the numerous cases filed.

== England and Wales ==
In England and Welsh law, laws on libel can be considered to be more favourable to the plaintiff than in other jurisdictions, leading to a form of forum shopping sometimes called "defamation shopping" or "libel tourism".

In The Atlantic Star, Lord Denning MR famously stated:

You may call this "forum shopping" if you please, but if the forum is England, it is a good place to shop in, both for the quality of the goods and the speed of service.

== In international relations ==
In international relations (IR) theory, the term 'forum shopping' describes the situation where a state is member of two or more different international- or regional organizations which deal with the same policy area (overlapping regionalism) so the state can choose the forum (organization) for addressing a certain issue which serves its interests best. This is particularly important in international trade and in security issues.

== See also ==
- Asylum shopping
- Inspector shopping
- Jurisdiction shopping
- "Race to the courthouse"
- Regulator shopping
- SAD Scheme
- Tort reform
- Libel tourism
- International child abduction
