= Equalization payments =

Cash payment between governments

Equalization payments are cash payments made in some federal systems of government from the federal government to subnational governments with the objective of offsetting differences in available revenue or in the cost of providing services. Many federations use fiscal equalisation to reduce the inequalities in the fiscal capacities of sub-national governments arising from the differences in their geography, demography, natural endowments and economies. The level of equalisation sought can vary, however.

The payments are generally calculated based on the magnitude of the subnational "fiscal gap": essentially the difference between fiscal need and fiscal capacity. Fiscal capacity and fiscal need are not equivalent to measures of fiscal revenue and expenditure, as making them so would induce perverse incentives to subnational governments to reduce fiscal effort.

== Australia ==
Australia introduced a formal system of horizontal fiscal equalisation (HFE) in 1933 to compensate states/territories which have a lower capacity to raise revenue. The objective is full equalisation which means that, after HFE, each of the six states, the Australian Capital Territory and the Northern Territory would have the capacity to provide services and the associated infrastructure at the same standard, if each state/territory made the same effort to raise revenue from its own sources and operated at the same level of efficiency.

Currently the funds distributed to achieve HFE are the revenues raised from the Goods and Services Tax (GST), currently about AUD 50 bn a year. The distribution of GST required to achieve HFE is decided by the Federal Treasurer each year, on the basis of advice provided by the Commonwealth Grants Commission (CGC).

Achieving HFE does not mean that the states are directed how to raise revenue or how to spend their funds. GST revenue grants from the Commonwealth are unencumbered and available for any purpose. Accordingly, HFE equalises fiscal capacity, not fiscal policies which remain for the states to decide for themselves. It does not result in the same level of services or taxes in all states, direct that the states must achieve any specified level of service in any area, nor impose actual budget outcomes in accordance with the commission's calculations.

== Belgium ==
The only mechanism designed to reduce fiscal disparities between the federated entities in Belgium is a program called the National Solidarity Intervention (Dutch: Nationale Solidariteitsbijdrage (NSB); French: Intervention de solidarité nationale (ISN)). Under the program, regions in which the average per capita yield of personal income tax falls below the national average are entitled to an unconditional transfer from the federal government.

The amount paid to each region reflects the gap in the yield of personal income tax in the region in relation to the national average, weighted by an indexing factor and a factor pertaining to the amounts received by beneficiaries when the system was introduced. Their inferior fiscal capacity causes the Brussels and Walloon regions to be recipients of NSB/ISN transfers. The region of Flanders does not receive funding under the program, as its fiscal capacity lies above the national average.

== Canada ==
In Canada, the Government of Canada introduced a formal system of equalization payments in 1957, to help ensure that all 10 provinces can provide "access to broadly comparable levels of public services."

Using funds from its own general revenues, the federal government makes payments to the governments of less wealthy Canadian provinces to equalize the provinces' "fiscal capacity" – their ability to generate provincial tax revenues from the economic activity in their jurisdictions. The equalization program is one significant example of transfer payments from the federal to the provincial governments. The Canada Health Transfer (CHT) and the Canada Social Transfer (CST) are also notably large transfer programs. The Federal Government spends hundreds of billions across Canada to deliver programs and services; of the $480.5 budgeted for federal expenditures (figure excludes public debt charges) in 2024–25, major federal transfers to all provinces and territories totalled $99.4 billion, including $25.3 billion in equalization payments to seven provinces.

Over the entire existence of Equalization, each of the 10 provinces have received transfers at different points in time.

Canada's territories are not included in the equalization program - the federal government addresses territorial fiscal needs through the Territorial Formula Financing (TFF) program.

Equalization payments are based on a formula that calculates the difference between the per capita revenue yield that a particular province would obtain using average tax rates and the national average per capita revenue yield at average tax rates. The current formula considers five major revenue sources (see below). The objective of the program is to ensure that all provinces have access to per capita revenues equal to the potential average of all ten provinces. The formula is based solely on revenues and does not consider the cost of providing services or the expenditure need of the provinces.

Equalization payments do not involve wealthy provinces making payments to poor provinces, as citizens and businesses in all provinces are simply paying their federal taxes into the federal treasury. The federal government then uses the revenue to fund any and all federal spending, be it the military, infrastructure, elderly and child care benefits, border security, policing, TFF, CHT, CST, and so on. Critics in "have" provinces focus on the technicality that "their" money (rather than the money the federal government has collected in general) is funding the "have not" provinces. In reality, as an example, a wealthy citizen in New Brunswick, a so-called "have not" province, technically pays more into Equalization than a poorer citizen in Alberta, a so-called "have" province. However, because of Alberta's greater wealth, the citizens of Alberta as a whole can be deemed net contributors to Equalization (and higher per capita contributors to the military, infrastructure, health care, and so on) while the citizens of New Brunswick are net receivers of Equalization payments.

The money the provinces receive through equalization can be spent in any way the provincial government desires. The payments help guarantee "reasonably comparable levels" of health care, education, and welfare in all the provinces. The definition of "reasonably comparable levels", however, has been the subject of considerable debate.

== France ==
Article 72-2 of the French constitution (amended 28 March 2003) created the obligation of the state to promote equality between regional bodies (regions and municipalities). That is achieved by direct tax collection by local government (Taxe professionelle) and grants from central government. Direct financing by the state amounted to 28% of revenues in 2011, devolved tax revenues account for 60% of revenues, and debt accounted for the remainder.

== Germany ==
According to Section 8 of the Weimar Constitution, taxation became a matter of the federal government in 1919 and the states lost their ability to generate income. Thus, the state tax law of 1920 supplied for equalization payments among the states which ensured that no state would have less than 80% of the average state tax revenue. Sections 106 and 107 of the Constitution of the Federal Republic of Germany supply for the distribution of tax revenues (horizontal and vertical equalization). This includes reducing the revenues of richer states in favour of the poorer ones. In 2015 this amounted to the re-distribution of 9.594 billion Euros from the states of Bavaria, Baden-Württemberg, Hesse and Hamburg to all the other states.

== Switzerland ==
The first elements of an equalization system in Switzerland were introduced in 1938 in the form of conditional grants, which varied according to the tax capacity of the cantons. In 1958, a constitutional article gave the federal government the authority to equalize fiscal disparities. Christopher Hengan-Braun, a Swiss economist, was the main source of guidance in 1958 for the federal government to help balance Switzerland's fiscal disparities.

== See also ==
- Fiscal imbalance
- Fiscal federalism
