= Inspector shopping =

Inspector shopping is a colloquial term referring to the deliberate manipulation of the inspector selection processes to secure more favorable outcomes or avoid unfavorable consequences during assessments, audits, and inspections. Inspector shopping involves strategically selecting inspectors based on their perceived inexperience, leniency, or susceptibility to bribery or other corruption. Individuals or entities may delay inspections until a preferred inspector is available, request a specific inspector for a job, or manipulate the selection process to ensure a desired inspector is assigned to their case. The term "inspector shopping" has a negative connotation and its corrupt gamesmanship and manipulation undermine the legitimacy of the regulatory process in order to obtain an unfair advantage.

This practice occurs in various industries, including construction, food safety, environmental regulation, healthcare, and manufacturing. Inspector shopping negatively impacts public safety, consumer protection, and environmental standards, as it leads to substandard work, dangerous products, or hazardous conditions going unnoticed or unreported.

To mitigate the risks posed by inspector shopping and preserve the integrity of the inspection processes, regulatory agencies and industries have implemented countermeasures including random inspector assignment, regular rotation of inspection personnel, and rigorous monitoring of inspector selection protocols.

== Aviation ==
In Australia, a 2014 aviation regulatory review found that inspector shopping was prevalent.

In the United States, Boeing manufacturing and design issues have been attributed in part to inspector shopping.

== Taxation ==
In international taxation, it was common practice to shop for a favorable tax inspector, though frowned upon.

== See also ==
- Judge shopping
