= Centre for Tax Policy and Administration =

The Centre for Tax Policy and Administration is part of the Secretariat of the Organisation for Economic Co-operation and Development in France. Manal Corwin serves as the director of the Centre.

== Activities ==
Among its initiative have been:

- Guidance on Fiscal federalism
- Base erosion and profit shifting (OECD project)
- Greater Exchange of information between tax authorities
- The Convention on Mutual Administrative Assistance in Tax Matters
- Criticism of transparency of tax havens such as Monaco and Panama

The Centre released the report Harmful Tax Competition: An Emerging Global Issue.
