= Tax revenue =

Income collected by governments via tax

Tax revenue is the income that is collected by governments through taxation. Taxation is the primary source of government revenue. Revenue may be extracted from sources such as individuals, public enterprises, trade, royalties on natural resources and/or foreign aid. An inefficient collection of taxes is greater in countries characterized by poverty, a large agricultural sector and large amounts of foreign aid.

Just as there are different types of tax, the form in which tax revenue is collected also differs; furthermore, the agency that collects the tax may not be part of central government, but may be a third party licensed to collect tax which they themselves will use. For example, in the UK, the Driver and Vehicle Licensing Agency (DVLA) collects vehicle excise duty, which is then passed on to HM Treasury.

Tax revenues on purchases come in two forms: "tax" itself is a percentage of the price added to the purchase (such as sales tax in U.S. states, or VAT in the UK), while "duties" are a fixed amount added to the purchase price (e.g., for cigarettes). In order to calculate the total tax raised from these sales, we must work out the effective tax rate multiplied by the quantity supplied.

== Taxation and state capacity ==
Taxation was a key task in any country as it advances state capacity and accountability. Charles Tilly identifies taxation as a form of extraction that allows the state to execute its primary functions: public policies (education, infrastructures, health care), state making, and protection. Taxation became indispensable in western Europe, when countries needed to fund wars in order to survive. This European model was later exported all around the world. Today, the level of taxation is used as an indicator of state capacity. Developed countries raise more taxes and therefore are able to provide better services. At the same time, the high taxation forces them to become accountable with their citizens, which strengthens the democracy.

Tax revenue from individual income tax is a greater percentage of tax revenues in developed countries than in developing countries. Tax revenues in developing countries rely more on taxes on goods and services than do tax revenues in developed countries.

== Changes in taxation level ==
The effect of a change in taxation level on total tax revenue depends on the good being investigated, and in particular on its price elasticity of demand. Where goods have a low elasticity of demand (they are price inelastic), an increase in tax or duty will lead to a small decrease in demand—not enough to offset the higher tax raised from each unit. Overall tax revenue will therefore rise. Conversely, for price-elastic goods, an increase in tax rate or duty would lead to a fall in tax revenue.

=== Laffer curve ===
The Laffer curve theorises that, even for price-inelastic goods (such as addictive necessary items), there will be a tax revenue maximising point, beyond which total tax revenue will fall as taxes increase. This may be due to:

- A cost limit on what can actually be afforded
- The existence of expensive substitutes (which become less expensive)
- An increase in tax evasion (e.g., through the black market)
- The shrinking of business caused by increased taxes

The Laffer curve, however, is not universally accepted; Paul Krugman referred to it as "junk economics".

== Revenue administration ==
=== Public sector ===
A limiting factor in determining the government budget is the capacity to tax. Per capita income (PCI) is the most often used measure of relative fiscal capacity. But this measure fails to base tax capacity computation on other important tax bases like the sales and property tax and corporate income taxes. A representative tax system should assess the level of personal income, the value of retail sales and the value of property to compute fiscal capacity. To do so the average tax rate for each base is computed by dividing the total revenue derived by the total value of the base. Thus, as an example, income taxes collected would be divided by total income to yield a rate of taxation.

The averages of each tax base can be used in comparison to other states or communities, that is, the average of other states or communities, to determine whether or not a government compares favorably regionally or nationally. A state or community's standing on these various bases may affect its ability to attract new industry. The resulting rates, high or low in comparison, can become targets for change. The mission of revenue administration is to provide prudent and innovative revenue, investment and risk management and to regulate the use of government capital.

There are four core responsibilities for the revenue administrator:

- Manage and invest financial assets prudently
- Administer tax and revenue programs fairly and efficiently
- Manage risk associated with loss of public assets
- Regulate capital expenditure

New real estate development may not only enhance the economic base of a state or community, and it may also expand the tax base. It is not always the case, however, that new developments, especially if not properly planned, can in the aggregate, have a negative impact on the tax base. Economic development traditionally focuses on such things as job generation, the provision of affordable housing, and the creation of retail centers. Tax base expansion focuses primarily on maintaining and enhancing real estate values within the municipality. Municipalities tend to pursue economic development with religious fervor and often do not think strategically about the overall real estate impacts of their economic development initiatives. Yet the existing tax base in almost every municipality throughout the United States is an important source of revenue for funding municipal and school expenditures.

For public sector officials it is important to recognize the potential for a conflict between these two distinct, yet overlapping areas of public policy, and to establish procedures to achieve the proper balance in this regard. For real estate investors it is important to recognize when public policy is not fully cognizant of the impact of its actions on the real estate market, because of the potential negative impact on property values.

In summary, the concept of tax base management is really one of asset management and is particularly important in U.S. states where municipalities derive much of their revenue from their real estate assessments. City officials in Concord, New Hampshire found that a five percent overall increase in the assessed value of existing property would have the same impact on the tax rate as the addition of 2,000,000 square feet (190,000 m^{2}) of new industrial property or 1,000,000 square feet (93,000 m^{2}) of new office/R&D development, both of which are likely to take fifteen or more years to realize.

In addition to being responsible for managing the tax base, a community should also be responsible for helping to ensure economic prosperity for its citizens. These two goals can conflict unless a long-term view is taken regarding public policy actions, and unless the impact of alternate development actions and programs and priorities are not carefully evaluated. Good tax base management may lead to even better economic development, because investors and businesses will want to be in a community. Instead of offering incentives to attract business, they may be willing to pay to come to a community because it's a good place to live, work, shop and play.

== See also ==
- List of countries by tax revenue
