= Tax competition =

Form of regulatory competition

Tax competition, a form of regulatory competition, exists when governments use reductions in fiscal burdens to encourage the inflow of productive resources or to discourage the exodus of those resources. Often, this means a governmental strategy of attracting foreign direct investment, foreign indirect investment (financial investment), and high value human resources by minimizing the overall taxation level and/or special tax preferences, creating a comparative advantage.

Scholars generally consider economic development incentives to be inefficient, economically costly, and distortionary.

== History ==
From the mid-1900s governments had more freedom in setting their taxes, as the barriers to free movement of capital and people were high. The gradual process of globalization is lowering these barriers and results in rising capital flows and greater manpower mobility.

Governments can respond in varied ways to mitigate the adverse effects of tax competition. Governments can take unilateral action, make bilateral agreements, or rely on an overarching tax authority:

- Tax harmonization
- Interjurisdictional cooperation and supranational institutions
- Minimum tax rates
- Controlled Foreign Corporation Rules (e.g. GILTI)
- Bans on taxes and centralization
- Constitutional restrictions and tax and expenditure limitations (TELs)
- Sourcing rules
- Formula apportionment
- Auditing and enforcement
- Mobility restrictions
- Tax treaties
- Limitations on bidding for firms and subsidy deals
- Amalgamations and mergers
- Public-private partnerships
- Intergovernmental grants

== Impact ==
According to a 2020 study, tax competition "primarily reduces taxes for mobile firms and is unlikely to substantially affect the efficiency of business location." A 2020 NBER paper found some evidence that state and local business tax incentives in the United States led to employment gains but no evidence that the incentives increased broader economic growth at the state and local level.

== Examples ==
=== European Union ===
The European Union (EU) also illustrates the role of tax competition. The barriers to free movement of capital and people were reduced close to nonexistence. Some countries (e.g. Republic of Ireland) utilized their low levels of corporate tax to attract large amounts of foreign investment while paying for the necessary infrastructure (roads, telecommunication) from EU funds. The net contributors (like Germany) strongly oppose the idea of infrastructure transfers to low tax countries. Net contributors have not complained, however, about recipient nations such as Greece and Portugal, which have kept taxes high and not prospered. EU integration brings continuing pressure for consumption tax harmonization as well. EU member nations must have a value-added tax (VAT) of at least 15 percent (the main VAT band) and limits the set of products and services that can be included in the preferential tax band. Still this policy does not stop people utilizing the difference in VAT levels when purchasing certain goods (e.g. cars). The contributing factor are the single currency (Euro), growth of e-commerce and geographical proximity.

The political pressure for tax harmonization extends beyond EU borders. Some neighbouring countries with special tax regimes (e.g. Switzerland) were already forced to some concessions in this area.

== Criticism ==
Advocates for tax competition say it generally results in benefits to taxpayers and the global economy.

Some economists argue that tax competition is beneficial in raising total tax intake due to low corporate tax rates stimulating economic growth.

It has also been argued that just as competition is good for businesses, competition is good for governments as it drives efficiencies and good governance of the public budget.

Others point out that tax competition between countries bears no relation to competition between companies in a market: consider, for instance, the difference between a failed company and a failed state—and that while market competition is regarded as generally beneficial, tax competition between countries is always harmful.

Some observers suggest that tax competition is generally a central part of a government policy for improving the lot of labour by creating well-paid jobs (often in countries or regions with very limited job prospects). Others suggest that it is beneficial mainly for investors, as workers could have been better paid (both through lower taxation on them, and through higher redistribution of wealth) if it was not for tax competition lowering effective tax rates on corporations.

The Organisation for Economic Co-operation and Development (OECD) organized an anti-tax competition project in the 1990s, culminating with the publication of "Harmful Tax Competition: An Emerging Global Issue" in 1998 and the creation of a blacklist of so-called tax havens in 2000. Blacklisted jurisdictions effectively resisted the OECD by noting that several of the member nations also were tax havens according to the OECD's own definition.

Left-wing economists generally argue that governments need tax revenue to cover debts and contingencies, and that paying to fund a welfare state is an obligation of social responsibility. Another argument is that tax competition is a zero-sum game. Right-wing economists argue that tax competition means that taxpayers can vote with their feet, choosing the region with the most efficient delivery of governmental services. This makes the tax base of a state volitional because the taxpayer can avoid tax by renouncing citizenship or emigrating and thereby changing tax residence.

In April 2021, US Secretary of the Treasury Janet Yellen has proposed a global minimum corporate tax rate, to avoid profit shifting by companies to avoid taxation.

== See also ==
- Tax exemption
- Tax harmonization
- Race to the bottom
