= Harmful Tax Competition: An Emerging Global Issue =

Harmful Tax Competition: An Emerging Global Issue is a report issued by the Organisation for Economic Co-operation and Development's Centre for Tax Policy and Administration.

In the report, the OECD groups countries into three categories: member country preferential regimes, tax havens, and non-member economies, and establishes criteria for identifying each. Tax havens are characterised by having only nominal or no taxes, impeding the free exchange of information on taxpayers with other governments through administrative practices or laws, non-transparency, and a lack of substantial activities. Harmful preferential regimes, whether in member or non-member countries, are identified by four main traits. Like tax havens, their legal or administrative systems hamper the exchange of information and create an absence of transparency, and have effectively low or no taxes. Finally, the regime may partially isolate itself from the taxpayers and bear little to none of the tax burden, a practice known as “ring-fencing.”

== See also ==
- Tax competition
- Tax haven
