= Tax harmonization =

Tax policy

Tax harmonization is generally understood as a process of adjusting tax systems of different jurisdictions in the pursuit of a common policy objective. Tax harmonization involves the removal of tax distortions affecting commodity and factor movements in order to bring about a more efficient allocation of resources within an integrated market. Tax harmonization may serve alternative goals, such as equity or stabilization. It also can be subsumed, along with public expenditure harmonization, under the broader concept of fiscal harmonization. Narrowly defined, tax harmonization guided by this policy goal implies — under simplifying assumptions about other policy instruments and economic structure — convergence toward a more uniform effective tax burden on commodities or on factors of production. Convergence may be attained through the alignment of one or several elements that enter the determination of effective tax rates: the statutory tax rate and tax base, and enforcement practices. Perhaps the most widely accepted argument for harmonization involves convergence in the definition of product value or income for tax purposes. Such tax base harmonization would contribute to transparency for economic decision-making and, thus, to improved efficiency in resource allocation. In particular, a common income tax base for multinational companies operating in different jurisdictions would be instrumental not only in enhancing efficiency, but also in preventing overlaps or gaps in tax claims by different countries. Tax harmonization is an important part of the fiscal integration process. Fiscal integration is the process by which a group of countries agree on taking measures that lead to a higher level of fiscal convergence, the ultimate goal being the formation of a fiscal union. Tax harmonization doesn't automatically lead to the formation of a fiscal union, the second part involving much larger scale project that includes fiscal transfers, a fully harmonized legislation and maybe some supervising institutions, beside a long-run agreement. Starting from the definition given to the fiscal integration process, we can easily say that tax harmonization is the process by which a heterogeneous group of countries, federal states or even local governments agree on setting a minimum and maximum level of their tax rates, including also a higher degree of harmonization of tax legislation, in order to attract foreign investors and to encourage local development and investments.

== Trade-off with tax competition ==
There is a trade-off between tax harmonization and tax competition. Controlling tax rates not only stabilizes tax revenues, but is also sometimes necessary for moving forward with economic and political integration. On the other hand, deregulating tax rates maintains the autonomy of member countries in tax matters for their own economic and social policy purposes. In addition, it mitigates political distortions.

== Tax harmonization advantages ==
Tax harmonization can prevent a Race to the Bottom.

Since regions have harmonized tax rates, they do not compete over capital by reducing tax rates. This prevents all regions to reduce their tax rates in order to ensure that their country is the most attractive from the point of view of tax costs, as this battle has its own price in the reduction of tax rates resulting in a reduction in tax revenues.

Less costs regarding public revenues as tax rates are commonly set and do not disadvantage or advantage one region.

The harmonization of legislation could lead to less costs for multinational companies.

Allows the use of fiscal transfers between regions, reducing borrowing costs on capital markets or from private or international lenders.

== Disadvantages of tax harmonization ==
Implies cooperation between different regions, which isn't always possible giving the fact that politicians and the general public may be sceptical about fiscal integration.

A coordination and surveillance institution is necessary, thus presenting additional costs.

Tax harmonization may create a democratic deficit.

Given the fact that in some regions tax rates will increase, tax evasion may spread outside of the entities participating in the harmonisation.

Tax harmonization stops tax competition, which before may have helped small countries attract multinational companies.

== Tax harmonization in EU ==
In the EU, the policy of tax harmonization is not regular in the taxation field, however in order to have a well-functioning single market the alteration of national fiscal policies is said to be key. Through the actions of European Institutions in fiscal policy coordination and harmonization of tax laws, or by the action of the European Court of Justice in prohibiting certain national tax rules that violate EU rules, tax harmonization can be achieved.

=== Value-Added Tax ===
The Value-Added Tax is part of the acquis communautaire, and two directives (1977 and 2006) closely codify the VAT regime in EU Member states, with a minimum standard rate of 15% and a restricted list of reduced rates. Excise duties are also subject to minimum rates, based on Articles 191-192 of the Treaty on the Functioning of the European Union. This treaty base allows the Council and the Parliament to take decisions, including on taxes, to protect human health, safeguard the environment and promote a “rational utilization of natural resources”.

=== Capital income tax ===
In 1990, the Parent-subsidiary directive tackled the issue of double taxation of repatriated profits by a mother company from its subsidiaries. Four Member states were requested either to exempt repatriated profits, or to deduct taxes already paid by the affiliates from the mother's tax bill in a partial credit system. The objective was to avoid discriminating against foreign subsidiaries by enforcing double taxation in relation to purely domestic firms which are taxed only once. In 2003, the Interest and Royalties directive further reduced the incidence of double taxation by abolishing withholding taxes on cross-border interest and royalty payments within the EU.

== See also ==
- Base erosion and profit shifting
- Tax competition
- Minimum corporate tax rate
