= Fiscal capacity =

Ability of the government to raise revenue

Fiscal capacity is the ability of the state to extract revenues to provide public goods and carry out other functions of the state, given an administrative, fiscal accounting structure. In economics and political science, fiscal capacity may be referred to as tax capacity, extractive capacity or the power to tax, as taxes are a main source of public revenues. Nonetheless, though tax revenue is essential to fiscal capacity, taxes may not be the government's only source of revenue. Other sources of revenue include foreign aid and natural resources.

In addition to the amount of public revenue the state extracts, fiscal capacity is the state's investment in "state structures—including monitoring, administration, and compliance through such things as training tax inspectors and running the revenue service efficiently". When investment in these administrative or bureaucratic fiscal structures are specific to the state's power to extract resources, fiscal capacity is moreover related to a larger concept of state capacity. Finally, given that public goods funded by fiscal capacity include infrastructure development, health, education, military and social insurance, a state's fiscal capacity is essential to its economic growth, development, and state-building.

== Definitions and patterns ==
Fiscal capacity is the ability of the government to raise revenues, and is frequently measured as the proportion of gross domestic product generated by tax revenue. Overall, wealthier developed countries have larger, stronger tax administrations and raise more money through tax revenue than poorer, developing countries. As is such, the more revenue a government collects, the greater fiscal capacity is. However, fiscal capacity is measured not only by the level of tax revenue a state is able to raise, but by the tax administration's ability to enforce tax policies.

Besley and Persson (2012) present a list of "stylized facts" that describe the evolution and patterns of fiscal capacity. These facts are patterns identified from an analysis of cross-sectional and time series data on 73 countries since 1800:

1. Rich countries have made successive investments in their fiscal capacities over time.
2. Rich countries collect a much larger share of their income in taxes than do poor countries.
3. Rich countries rely to a much larger extent on income taxes as opposed to trade taxes than do poor countries
4. High-tax countries rely to a much larger extent on income taxes as opposed to trade taxes than do low tax countries.
5. Rich countries collect much higher tax revenue than poor countries despite comparable statutory rates.

=== Tax structure ===
Fiscal capacity changes from state to state, not only in the amount of tax revenue that each state is able to extract but also the way in which revenue is extracted. Specifically, different types of taxes are considered more economically efficient, and accordingly more ideal, than others. More information can be found on tax types and economic efficiency in the page on Tax. The strength of a state's fiscal capacity is thus determined by not only the amount of revenue collected, but also influenced by the efficiency of its tax structure.

For instance, optimal taxation theory states that the ideal tax structure maximizes efficiency; inefficient taxes include the corporate income tax, tariffs and seignorage, while efficient taxes include income taxes and consumption taxes such as the value-added tax. As is such, richer developed countries and states with strong fiscal capacity tend to rely on these efficient tax types, whereas the opposite holds true for poorer, developing countries.

Poorer countries tend to rely on less efficient tax types, and accordingly have weaker fiscal capacities. Likewise, developing countries with weak fiscal capacities are more likely to be unable to provide public goods. The social science literature on fiscal capacity and economic development aims, in part, to solve this puzzle of why developing countries cannot strengthen fiscal capacity by simply increasing their use of efficient tax types and lowering the use of inefficient tax types.

Low fiscal capacity is typically a consequence of underdeveloped political, social and economic conditions in a state. First, as countries differ in their investments on the military, public education, infrastructure (etc.), different tax structures can reflect varying preferences for private versus public goods, and redistribution. Secondly, inefficient tax structure and weak fiscal capacity indicate the presence of tax evasion, a relationship that is further examined in the section below on the informal economy. Overall, favorable tax types are correlated to greater fiscal capacity because they impose fewer economic efficiency costs, but also encourage more efficient tax collection by minimizing tax evasion.

== In practice ==
=== Informal economy ===
When fiscal capacity is weak, governments are not able to monitor or tax the entire population. The informal economy is the part of the economy that is not monitored by the government. It exists when the general population can easily evade taxes due to factors such as low tax-morale, low-quality governance, and insufficient resources for large, quality tax administrations like that of the US's Internal Revenue Service. Likewise, informal economies have a larger presence in developing countries. In 2000, Friedrich Schneider and Dominik Enste estimated that the size of "the informal economy on average is only about 15% of GDP among OECD countries... However, among developing states, the median size of the informal economy they report is 37% of GDP, ranging from 13% of GDP in Hong Kong and Singapore to 71% in Thailand and 76% in Nigeria." Informal economies also explain why developing countries cannot simply raise tax rates, like in their more developed counterparts, to attain a higher GDP or fund more public goods.

When taxes are raised, people have an incentive to shift out of the taxable formal sector into the non-taxed informal sector so as to avoid paying higher tax rates. States with regions culturally unaccustomed to the idea of tax collection have low tax morale, and are even more likely to circumvent the state's attempt to impose taxes. Thus, compliance depends on the social and political environment of the state, as well as the ability of administrations to enforce compliance. In poorer states with low administrative capacities, the presence of large informal economies may mean that it is easy for people to avoid taxes if tax are raised.

As a solution to tax evasion, governments with lower administrative and technological capabilities place less efficient but more easily monitored taxes. For instance, it is difficult to track the incomes for each individual within the population in order to collect income taxes, or the sales of each good and service to collect consumption taxes. Comparatively, it is much easier to impose an import/export tax at specific checkpoints along the border. Tariffs are easier to collect because they require fewer technological or administrative resources, and do not necessarily require depend on a strong cultural of tax compliance. Additionally, Emran and Stiglitz (2005) argue that adding "tariffs may provide a less distorting source of tax revenue" because it may encourage tax evasion less than for instance, increasing income taxes. In other words, if certain types of taxes incentivize the general population to move into an informal economy out of the control of the government, it may be in the government's best interest to exact tax types that will discourage tax evasion in spite of economic efficiencies. Thus, despite the superior efficiency of certain tax types compared to others, taxes traditionally considered inefficient may better achieve fiscal goals in the presence of informal economies.

All in all, states with low fiscal capacity tend to use inefficient tax types when large informal economies are present, and if they do not have the administrative capacity to support the collection of efficient taxes.

==== Economic models of tax evasion ====
Besley and Persson have developed several economic models to better understand non-compliance, and why developing countries are not able increase their fiscal capacity by simply raising taxes. Focusing on taxes on income and consumption, Besley and Persson's (2012) general model demonstrates that citizens always have the incentive to evade taxes, and they will only choose not to evade if the cost of evasion (i.e. a tax penalty) is too high. This cost depends on the government's ability to monitor individuals and sales and enforce penalties, an administrative capability that requires a history of investment decisions to improve the tax administration. In other words, whether or not citizens choose to participate in the informal economy today depends strongly on the conditions and choices made by policymakers of the past. If citizens are more likely to participate in the informal economy, than the state cannot improve fiscal capacity by simply raising taxes if it does not have a political, legal and fiscal history that has supported such state-power.

In comparison to Besley and Persson's individual level study, Gordon and Li (2009) focus on the role of businesses and the financial sector in developed versus developing countries. They model businesses' participation in the financial sector—where Gordon and Li specifically refer to participation in the financial sector as using banks—as participation in the formal sector; they assume that tax authorities can monitor bank records, so that mass participation in the financial sector lends the state information and likewise, the power to tax. Gordon and Li (2009) demonstrate that because the financial sector is important in developed countries, businesses will choose to use banks and not evade taxes. Comparatively, the financial sector may be weaker in developing countries and businesses may have less incentive to use the banking system and instead opt to use cash. As is such, Gordon and Li (2009) conclude that "as the financial sector improves in effectiveness, more firms will be pulled into using it in spite of the tax implications of doing so".

=== Administration ===
Fiscal capacity and tax structure depends immensely on the strength and capabilities of the tax administration itself. However, tax administrations are complex and require a vast amount of resources that not all states can afford. In "Administrative Dimensions of Tax Reform", Richard Bird explains that the strength of a tax administration is determined by the number of trained personnel, adequate infrastructure (including technology and modern computer systems), as well as a functioning "information system". This information system determines which goods and activities are to be taxed (the tax base), as well as identifies, classifies and monitors taxpayers. It further facilitates the collection of information from each individual, third parties, and other sources from within the tax administration. In addition, there should also exist a system of rewards and penalties to enforce tax compliance. And finally, there must be a system to both redress grievances and complaints should the system fail, and identify and address mistakes with the tax system before they occur.

As a monitoring body, tax administrations aim to enforce compliance and deter tax evasion. For instance, the Internal Revenue Service is an example of a strong tax administration, as it has a large number of employees and can therefore more easily monitor each individual in the US. On the other hand, where poorer countries lack tax personnel, policymakers may change their tax policies to reflect this lower administrative capacity. As previously explained in the section on the informal economy, states with low quality tax administrations may rely on an inefficient tax such as a border tax, since monitoring the border is easier than monitoring each individual or transaction within the state.

In practice, collecting a large amount of tax revenue without the use of inefficient taxes becomes complicated in the presence of tax evasion. A tax administration's goal is to therefore not simply maximize revenue and economic efficiency, but to monitor the peoples of a state and facilitate tax compliance.

== Origins ==
Economic history highlights the importance of understanding the history and development of revenue collection in the evolution from the pre-modern state to the modern state, and furthered understanding the fiscal differences between developed and developing countries. In particular, social science theory not only highlights the role of tax structure and administrative capacity, but the motives that different actors have when building fiscal capacity.

=== Incentives and constraints ===
Crucial to economic models and historical theories regarding fiscal capacity such as that of Besley and Persson, Charles Tilly, Gordon and Li, James C. Scott et al., are the different actors that create and shape fiscal, and likewise state, development. Broadly put, much of the social science literature on the topic assumes that the origins of fiscal capacity lie in the decisions, incentives and constraints of different, self-interested actors that compete against one another. These agents compete for power and resources.

In "Seeing Like a State", James Scott for instance examines fiscal capacity as the product of the competitive relationship between state agents and the general population. In addition to the political actors who collect tax revenues and build tax administrations, citizens and local elite can threaten the supply of an economic resource (tax revenue) to the state. Specifically, if the state suffers from poor fiscal capacity—meaning, lacking "both the information and the administrative grid that would have allowed it to exact from its subjects a reliable revenue that was more closely tied to their actual capacity to pay"—the citizens of the state can migrate away or leave the state, quietly resist or violently revolt against the state, or evade taxes.

Besley and Persson (2009) further demonstrate that as fiscal capacity develops over time, the choices made by current policymakers depend on the legal, political, and fiscal constraints imposed by the actors who previously held power. North and Weingast (1989) for instance, stressed "the importance of the imposition of constitutional constraints after 1689 in reining in the power of the monarch as a precondition for the subsequent success of the English state and economy." In a summary of literature regarding fiscal capacity, Johnson and Koyama (2015) further highlight an agreement among historians, that watershed moments in "the constitutional and fiscal history of England" as well as the "important role played by political elites and the formation of political parties" were essential to "granting the state previously undreamt of powers to raise taxes, spend and borrow" while preventing the crown from later exploiting the power to tax for itself. Johnson and Koyama also emphasize the goals of the elite: "it is not so clear where the support for these [fiscal] institutions comes from initially. Frequently it is the private-order institutions—such as family alliances, religious organizations, or informal trade networks—which from the bases around which public-order institutions [such as tax administrations, land registries or courts] are eventually built.

=== War ===
Political historians, such as Samuel P. Huntington and Charles Tilly, postulate that war is the primary incentive for states to invest in fiscal capacity. In War Making and State Making as Organized Crime, Tilly models the government as a self-interested, power-holding actor that wishes to extract revenue from its less-powerful citizenry; however, the state also protects its citizens from external threats in exchange for the resources and revenues that they provide. Likewise, a government or state has an incentive to make war against other states if it believes it will be successful, as it will then be able to collect more tax revenues from an expanded domain.

Tilly defines four main actions of the state as "war making, state making, protection [and] extraction", where "extraction" is "the means of carrying out the first three activities." "Extraction" takes place at all levels of the state—from the modern tax system to the pre-modern state, when individuals plundered each other's villages to extract resources. A parallel can be drawn to Marcus Olson's theory on roving and stationary bandits, in which the start of civilization stems from the incentive of a selfish 'stationary bandit' to capture and extract from a village over an extended period of time.

Since Tilly's monumental theories on war and state-building, his theories have since been reinforced by data and extended to non-European and contemporary states. Herbst for instance finds that while Europe's long history of war and violence led to the strong fiscal capacities today, most African states gained independence without war. Herbst first explains that war in Europe pressed governments "to find new and more regular sources of income" by improving fiscal capacity, incentivized citizens "to acquiesce to increased taxation...because a threat to their survival will overwhelm other concerns they might have about increased taxation", and led to nationalism allowing governments to exact power and collect taxes with greater ease; Herbst then demonstrates that in the absence of war, many African states have lacked these same incentives and have thus not been able to increase fiscal capacity.

Nonetheless, studies have also found that despite evidence in Europe, the relationship between fiscal capacity and war does not hold true in South America and Africa.

=== Legibility and simplification ===
Development economists Besley and Persson and Gordon and Li explain that fiscal capacity have to do with "deep structural change" that will be "conducive to extracting taxation". Both authors emphasize the importance of the formal sector and formal financial transactions, and specifically highlight that structural change comes from "mak[ing] transactions more visible to tax authorities". Likewise, to build fiscal capacity and create a modern state, political scientist James C. Scott emphasized that state agents must be able to operate and manage the state through processes of simplification, legibility and manipulation.

Primary examples of simplification, legibility and manipulation include the creation of standard metric system, in which consistent units of measurements would lead to legible prices and unify populaces to create a homogenous state. A standard metric system, Scott explains, laid the groundwork for additional practices such as centralized administrations and the creation of tax codes. Additionally, Scott emphasized that state naming and state mapping practices allowed states to be more easily administered, were "inevitably associated with taxes and hence aroused popular resistance." All in all, Scott emphasizes the importance of legibility and simplification in order for states to achieve fiscal capacity, and the role that fiscal capacity plays in state building via the incentives of the elite.

He, for instance, cites the failed fiscal goals of pre-revolutionary Russian state officials to transform an open-field system in which individuals shared a common property, to independent farmsteads where land was associated with individuals or households. This transformation, he explains, exemplifies state agents' incentives to make the general population "simplified and legible"; for instance, Russian state officials attempted to create a cadastral map, which, like a tax administration, consists of competent administrative agents creating a clear, simple and explicit register of property ownership. However, state officials were unable to achieve this 'legible' regime because the state's power to simplify the state was overcome by the general population's capacity to "subvert, block and even overturn" the state's attempt to standardize its populace.

As is such, Scott highlights that the creation of fiscal capacity depends on the state agents' ability to simplify and make the state legible, as well as the power of the opposing citizenry and local elites.
