= Race to the courthouse =

Informal legal term

"Race to the courthouse" is an informal name used to describe the rule in some jurisdictions that the first conveyance instrument, mortgage, lien or judgment to be filed with the appropriate recorder's office will have priority and prevail over documents filed subsequently, irrespective of the date of execution of the documents at issue.
