= Territorial Formula Financing =

Unconditional transfer payment from Canada

Territorial Formula Financing (TFF; French: Formule de financement des Territoires) is an annual unconditional transfer payment from Canada's federal government to the three territorial governments of Yukon, the Northwest Territories, and Nunavut to support the provision of public services.

A significant portion of the financial resources of the territorial governments comes from the Canadian federal government through the TFF grant. For instance, during the 2005–06 fiscal year, TFF was approximately 61 per cent of Yukon's, 66 per cent of the Northwest Territories' and 81 per cent of Nunavut's total financial resources.

In the 2023-24 fiscal year, Yukon will receive $1.252 billion ($28,208 per capita), the Northwest Territories $1.611 billion ($37,073 per capita) and Nunavut $1.971 billion ($47,520 per capita) for a total of $4.18 billion.
