= Canada Social Transfer =

Transfer payment program to provinces and territories

The Canada Social Transfer (CST; French: Transfert canadien en matière de programmes sociaux) is the Canadian government's transfer payment program in support of post-secondary education, social assistance, and social services, including early childhood development and early learning and childcare. It was made independent from the Canada Health and Social Transfer program on 1 April 2004 to allow for greater accountability and transparency for federal health funding. In 2008/2009, the program transferred $10.6 billion in cash to the provinces and a further $8.5 billion in tax points.

The program was originally combined with the Canada Health Transfer in a program called the Canada Health and Social Transfer.

== See also ==
- Education in Canada
