= Roberts Court =

Period of the US Supreme Court since 2005

Supreme Court of the United States
Roberts Court
- Rehnquist Court ← → Current
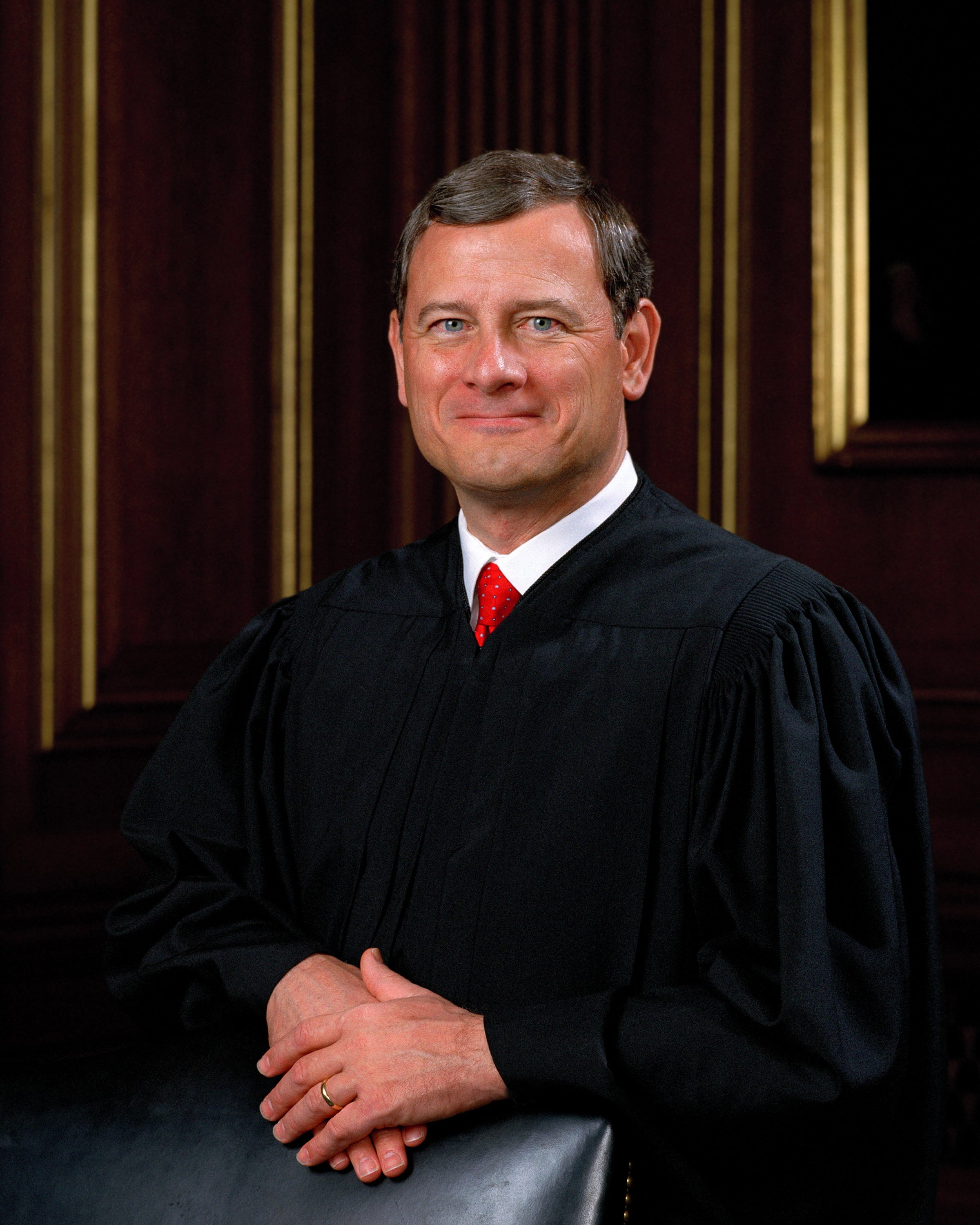
- Chief Justice John Roberts
- September 29, 2005 – 21 years, 53 days
- Seat: Supreme Court Building Washington, D.C.
- No. of positions: 9
- Roberts Court decisions

The Roberts Court is the time since 2005 during which the Supreme Court of the United States has been led by John Roberts as Chief Justice. Roberts succeeded William Rehnquist as Chief Justice after Rehnquist's death. It has been considered to be the most conservative court since the Vinson Court (1946–1953), with landmark rulings falling along partisan lines and very close confirmation votes for most of its members.

The ideology of the Roberts court was shaped early on by the retirement of the relatively moderate Justice Sandra Day O'Connor and the confirmation of the more conservative Justice Samuel Alito in 2006. The ideological balance shifted further rightward through the replacement of swing-vote Anthony Kennedy with Brett Kavanaugh in 2018 and the replacement of liberal Ruth Bader Ginsburg with Amy Coney Barrett in 2020 under the first Donald Trump administration. Some media outlets claim members of the Roberts court themselves are deeply politically polarized.

== Membership ==
Roberts was originally nominated by President George W. Bush as an associate justice to succeed Sandra Day O'Connor, who had announced her retirement, effective with the confirmation of her successor. However, before the Senate could act upon the nomination, Chief Justice William Rehnquist died. President Bush quickly withdrew the initial nomination and resubmitted it as a nomination for Chief Justice; this second Roberts nomination was confirmed by the Senate on September 29, 2005, by a 78–22 vote. Roberts took the constitutional oath of office, administered by senior Associate Justice John Paul Stevens (who was the acting chief justice during the vacancy) at the White House after his confirmation the same day. On October 3, Roberts took the judicial oath provided for by the Judiciary Act of 1789, prior to the first oral arguments of the 2005 term. The Roberts Court commenced with Roberts as Chief Justice and the remaining eight associate justices from the Rehnquist Court: Stevens, O'Connor, Antonin Scalia, Anthony Kennedy, David Souter, Clarence Thomas, Ruth Bader Ginsburg, and Stephen Breyer.

President Bush's second nominee to replace O'Connor, Harriet Miers, withdrew before a vote; Bush's third nominee to replace O'Connor was Samuel Alito, who was confirmed in January 2006. In 2009, President Barack Obama nominated Sonia Sotomayor to replace Souter; she was confirmed. In 2010, Obama nominated Elena Kagan to replace Stevens; she, too, was confirmed. In February 2016, Justice Scalia died; in the following month, Obama nominated Merrick Garland, but Garland's nomination was never considered by the Senate, and it expired when the 114th Congress ended and the 115th Congress began on January 3, 2017. On January 31, 2017, President Donald Trump nominated Neil Gorsuch to replace Scalia. Democrats in the Senate filibustered the nomination, however Gorsuch was confirmed in April 2017. In 2018, Trump nominated Brett Kavanaugh to replace Kennedy; he was confirmed. In September 2020, Justice Ginsburg died; Trump nominated Amy Coney Barrett to succeed Ginsburg and she was confirmed on October 26, 2020, eight days before the 2020 election. In January 2022, Breyer announced his retirement effective at the end of the Supreme Court term, assuming his successor was confirmed, in a letter to President Joe Biden. Biden nominated Ketanji Brown Jackson to succeed Breyer, and she was confirmed by the Senate three months later. Breyer remained on the Court until it went into its summer recess on June 30, at which point Jackson was sworn in, becoming the first black woman and the first former federal public defender to serve on the Supreme Court.

=== Timeline ===
Note: The blue vertical line denotes "now" (November 2026).

Bar key:
Ford appointee Reagan appointee G. H. W. Bush appointee Clinton appointee G. W. Bush appointee Obama appointee Trump appointee Biden appointee

== Other branches ==
Presidents during this court have been George W. Bush, Barack Obama, Donald Trump (two non-consecutive terms), and Joe Biden. Congresses included the 109th through the current 119th United States Congresses.

== Rulings of the Court ==
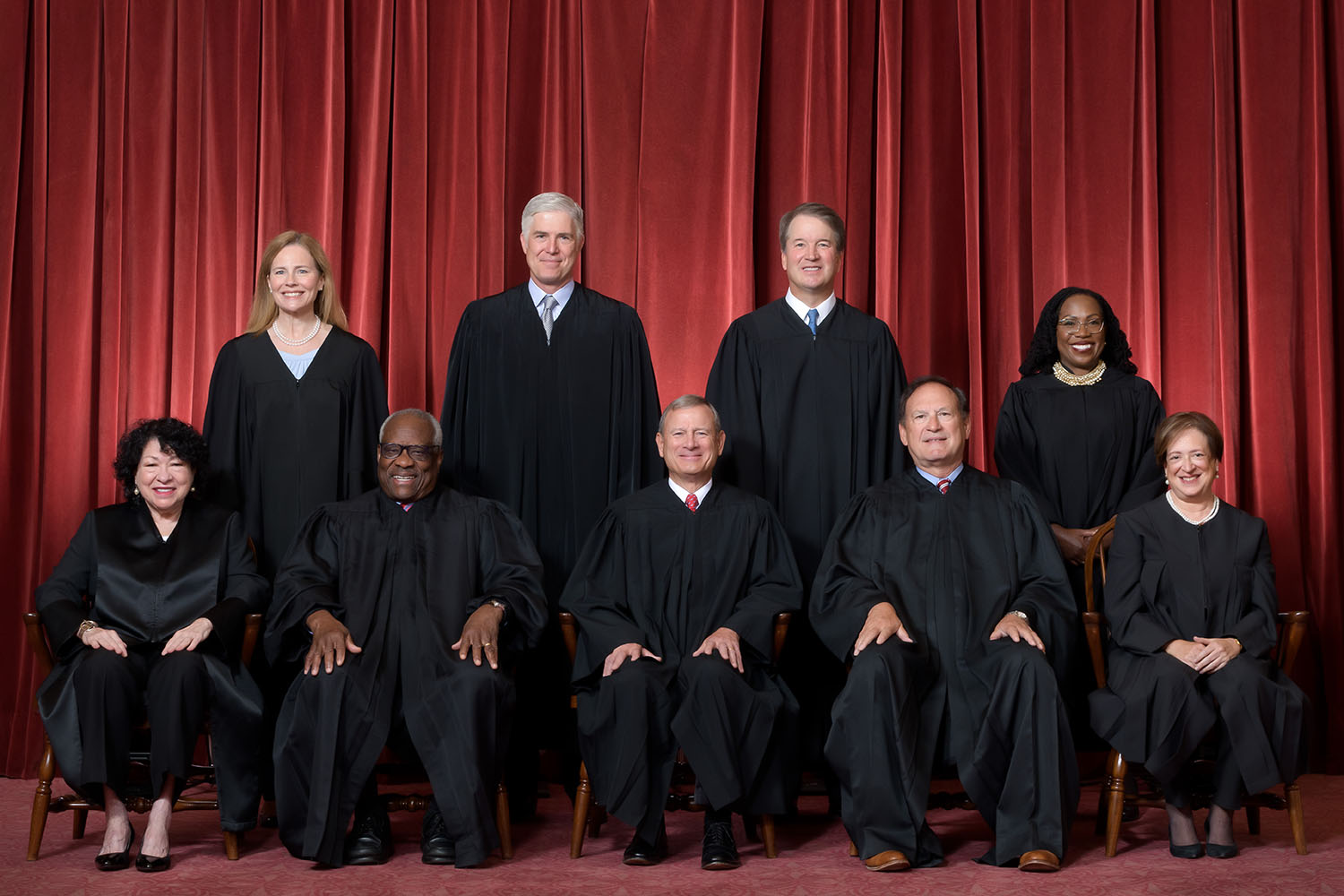
The Roberts Court (since June 30, 2022): Front row (left to right): Sonia Sotomayor, Clarence Thomas, Chief Justice John Roberts, Samuel Alito, and Elena Kagan. Back row (left to right): Amy Coney Barrett, Neil Gorsuch, Brett Kavanaugh, and Ketanji Brown Jackson.

The Roberts Court has issued major rulings on incorporation of the Bill of Rights, gun control, affirmative action, campaign finance regulation, election law, abortion, capital punishment, LGBT rights, unlawful search and seizure, and criminal sentencing. Major decisions of the Roberts Court include:

- Massachusetts v. EPA (2007): In a 5–4 decision in which the majority opinion was delivered by Justice Stevens, the Supreme Court upheld the Environmental Protection Agency's right to regulate carbon dioxide under the Clean Air Act.
- Medellín v. Texas (2008): In a 5–4 decision in which the majority opinion was delivered by Chief Justice Roberts, the Supreme Court held that even when a treaty constitutes an international commitment, it is not binding domestic law unless either the United States Congress has enacted statutes implementing it or the treaty is explicitly "self-executing".
- District of Columbia v. Heller (2008): In a 5–4 decision in which the majority opinion was delivered by Justice Scalia, the Supreme Court held that the Second Amendment applies to federal enclaves, and that the amendment protects the right of individuals to possess a firearm, regardless of service in a militia. McDonald v. City of Chicago (2010), in a 5–4 decision written by Justice Alito, extended this protection to the states.
- Kennedy v. Louisiana (2008): In a 5–4 decision written by Justice Kennedy, the court ruled that the Eighth Amendment prohibits capital punishment for crimes that do not involve homicide or treason.
- Ashcroft v. Iqbal (2009): In a 5–4 decision written by Justice Kennedy, the court reversed the Second Circuit's decision not to dismiss a suit against former Attorney General John Ashcroft and others that claimed that the FBI engaged in discriminatory activities following the 9/11 attacks. The court also extended the heightened pleading standard established in Bell Atlantic Corp. v. Twombly (2007), which had previously applied only to antitrust law. The number of dismissals greatly increased after the Iqbal ruling.
- Citizens United v. Federal Election Commission (2010): In a 5–4 decision in which the majority opinion was delivered by Justice Kennedy, the Court held that the provisions of the Bipartisan Campaign Reform Act which regulated independent expenditures in political campaigns by corporations, unions, and non-profits violated First Amendment freedom of speech rights.
- National Federation of Independent Business v. Sebelius (2012): In a 5–4 decision written by Chief Justice Roberts, the Court upheld most of the provisions of the Patient Protection and Affordable Care Act, including the individual mandate to buy health insurance. The mandate was upheld as part of Congress's power of taxation. In a subsequent case, King v. Burwell (2015), the Court upheld the Patient Protection and Affordable Care Act, this time in a 6–3 opinion written by Chief Justice Roberts. In a third related case, California v. Texas (2021), the Court held that neither states nor individuals had the standing to challenge the PPACA's individual mandate due to the penalty being reduced to $0 in the Tax Cuts and Jobs Act of 2017. The 7–2 ruling was written by Justice Breyer.
- Arizona v. United States (2012): In a 5–3 decision delivered by Justice Kennedy, the Court held that portions of Arizona SB 1070, an Arizona law regarding immigration, unconstitutionally usurped the federal authority to regulate immigration laws and enforcement.
- Shelby County v. Holder (2013): In a 5–4 decision delivered by Chief Justice Roberts, the Court held that section 4 of the Voting Rights Act of 1965 (52 U.S.C. § 10303), which provided a coverage formula for section 5 of the Voting Rights Act (52 U.S.C. § 10304), is unconstitutional. The latter section requires certain states and jurisdictions to obtain federal preclearance before changing voting laws or practices, in an effort to prevent those states and jurisdictions from discriminating against voters. Without a coverage formula, section 5 of the Voting Rights Act is no longer in effect.
- Burwell v. Hobby Lobby (2014): In a 5–4 decision delivered by Justice Alito, the Court exempted closely held corporations from the Affordable Care Act's contraception mandate on the basis of the Religious Freedom Restoration Act.
- Riley v. California (2014): In a 9–0 decision, the Court held that the warrantless search and seizure of digital contents of a cell phone during an arrest is unconstitutional.
- Obergefell v. Hodges (2015): In a 5–4 decision delivered by Justice Kennedy, the Court held that the Due Process Clause and the Equal Protection Clause both guarantee the right of same-sex couples to marry.
- Whole Woman's Health v. Hellerstedt (2016): In a 5–3 decision delivered by Justice Breyer, the Court struck down restrictions the state of Texas had placed on abortion clinics as an "undue burden" on access to abortion.
- Trinity Lutheran v. Comer (2017): Including religious organizations in publicly-funded, publicly-available benefits is not a violation of the Establishment Clause, and is instead required by the Free Exercise Clause. In a 5–4 decision written by Chief Justice Roberts, the Court expanded this ruling in Espinoza v. Montana Department of Revenue (2020), holding that a state-based scholarship program allowing students to attend private schools cannot exclude private religious schools.
- Trump v. Hawaii (2018): In a 5–4 decision written by Chief Justice Roberts, the Court overturned a preliminary injunction against the Trump travel ban, allowing it to go into effect. The Court also overturned the precedent Korematsu v United States (1944), which allowed President Franklin Delano Roosevelt to intern Japanese Americans during World War II.
- Carpenter v. United States (2018): In a 5–4 decision written by Chief Justice Roberts, the Court held that government acquisition of cell-site records is a Fourth Amendment search, and, thus, generally requires a warrant.
- Janus v. AFSCME (2018): In a 5–4 decision written by Justice Alito, the Court ruled that public-sector labor union fees from non-union members violate the First Amendment right to free speech, overturning the 1977 decision in Abood v. Detroit Board of Education that had previously allowed such fees.
- Timbs v. Indiana (2019): In a 9–0 decision, the Court ruled that the "excessive fines" clause of the Eighth Amendment is incorporated against state and local governments, affecting the use of civil forfeitures.
- Rucho v. Common Cause (2019): In a 5–4 decision written by Chief Justice Roberts, the Court held that partisan gerrymandering claims present nonjusticiable political questions.
- Bostock v. Clayton County (2020): In a 6–3 decision delivered by Justice Gorsuch, the Court ruled that Title VII employment protections of the Civil Rights Act of 1964 against sex discrimination necessarily also protect discrimination based on gender identity and sexual orientation.
- McGirt v. Oklahoma (2020): In a 5–4 decision written by Justice Gorsuch, the Court recognized a large part of modern-day Oklahoma as set aside by treaty as Indian country. This ruling meant Indian/Native American courts and federal courts must be the ones to prosecute and convict criminals under the Major Crimes Act rather than the Oklahoma state courts.
- New York State Rifle & Pistol Association, Inc. v. Bruen (2022): In a 6–3 decision delivered by Justice Thomas, the Court struck down a New York law requiring applicants for a concealed carry license to show "proper cause", ruling that the regulation prevented law-abiding citizens with ordinary self-defense needs from exercising their Second Amendment rights.
- Dobbs v. Jackson Women's Health Organization (2022): In a 6–3 decision written by Justice Alito and joined by Chief Justice Roberts, a Mississippi state law that bans most abortion operations after the first 15 weeks of pregnancy was upheld. In a 5–4 ruling, delivered by Justice Alito and not joined by Chief Justice Roberts, the Court also overturned Roe v. Wade and Planned Parenthood v. Casey, ruling that the Constitution does not confer a right to abortion.
- Kennedy v. Bremerton School District (2022): In a 6–3 decision delivered by Justice Gorsuch, the Court ruled that the government, while following the Establishment Clause, may not suppress an individual, in this case a public high school football coach, from engaging in personal religious observance, as doing so would violate the Free Speech and Free Exercise Clauses of the First Amendment. The Court overruled Lemon v. Kurtzman and the 51-year-old precedent known as the "Lemon test".
- Moore v. Harper (2023): In a 6–3 decision delivered by Chief Justice Roberts, the Court held that the Elections Clause did not give state legislatures sole power over elections, rejecting the independent state legislature theory.
- Students for Fair Admissions v. Harvard (2023): In a 6–2 decision delivered by Chief Justice Roberts, the Court ruled that affirmative action violated the Equal Protection Clause of the 14th Amendment, overturning Grutter v. Bollinger.
- 303 Creative LLC v. Elenis (2023): In a 6–3 decision written by Justice Gorsuch, the Court ruled that a businessperson cannot be compelled to create a work of art which goes against their values and which they would not produce for any client, limiting LGBT rights in favor of freedom of speech and religion.
- Trump v. Anderson (2024): In a unanimous 9–0 decision, the Court ruled that states could not determine eligibility for federal office, including the presidency, under Section 3 of the Fourteenth Amendment.
- Loper Bright Enterprises v. Raimondo (2024): In a 6–3 decision delivered by Chief Justice Roberts, the Court overturned Chevron U.S.A., Inc. v. Natural Resources Defense Council, Inc., one of the most cited cases in administrative law, ruling that it conflicted with the Administrative Procedure Act and ending the doctrine of Chevron deference.
- Trump v. United States (2024): In a 6–3 decision written by Chief Justice Roberts, the Court ruled that the president has absolute immunity for official actions taken under his core constitutional powers, presumptive immunity for other official actions, and no immunity for unofficial actions.
- City of Grants Pass v. Johnson (2024): In a 6–3 decision written by Justice Gorsuch, the Court ruled that the enforcement of generally applicable laws regulating camping on public property does not constitute "cruel and unusual punishment" prohibited by the Eighth Amendment.
- United States v. Skrmetti (2025): In a 6–3 decision written by Chief Justice Roberts, the Court held that Tennessee's SB1, which prohibits medical professionals from "[e]nabling a minor to identify with...a purported identity inconsistent with the minor's sex," or (2) "[t]reating purported discomfort...from a discordance between the minor's sex and asserted identity," is not sex-based discrimination and thus does not face heightened scrutiny.
- Mahmoud v. Taylor (2025): In a 6–3 decision written by Justice Alito, the Court held that the Free Exercise Clause requires public schools to accommodate parental religious beliefs, either by removing topics that may conflict with those beliefs from required curriculum, or by offering opt-outs and prior notice when such topics are covered in class.
- Learning Resources, Inc. v. Trump (2026): In a 6–3 decision written by Chief Justice Roberts, the Court ruled that the IEEPA does not authorize the president to impose tariffs.
- Louisiana v. Callais (2026): In a 6–3 decision written by Justice Alito, the Court held that section 2 of the Voting Rights Act prohibits state legislatures from factoring in race when drawing political districts, including when creating majority-minority districts. The court also updated the standards that petitioners of section 2 challenges must meet to prove that a map is an unconstitutional racial gerrymander.
- Trump v. Slaughter (2026): In a 6–3 decision written by Chief Justice Roberts, the Court overturned Humphrey's Executor v. United States, and allowed at-will removal of executive agency heads by the president.
- Trump v. Barbara (2026): In a 6–3 decision written by Chief Justice Roberts and joined by Justice Kavanaugh, Executive Order 14160's limitations on birthright citizenship were rejected as inconsistent with Congressional statutes such as the Nationality Act of 1940. In a 5–4 decision, written by Chief Justice Roberts and not joined by Justice Kavanaugh, the Court stated Executive Order 14160's limitations on birthright citizenship were inconsistent with the Fourteenth Amendment's Citizenship Clause and therefore not allowed.

== Judicial philosophy ==
The Roberts Court shifted ideologically further to the right after Donald Trump's first presidency, but was considered conservative from the beginning. Among former justices, Scalia and Kennedy had been more conservative, while Souter, Stevens, Ginsburg, and Breyer had been more liberal. These two groups of justices had aligned with each other in several significant cases, although Justice Kennedy occasionally joined the liberal bloc.

Roberts' strongest inclination on the Court before Trump had been to attempt to re-establish the centrist aesthetics of the Court as being party neutral, in contrast to his predecessor Rehnquist who had devoted significant effort to promote a 'states-rights' orientation for the Court. The judicial philosophy of Roberts on the Supreme Court before Trump was assessed by leading court commentators including Jeffrey Rosen and Marcia Coyle. The Roberts Court has been described by many as "dominated by an ambitious conservative wing" since Trump's first presidency.

Roberts, Thomas, Alito, Gorsuch, Kavanaugh, and Barrett generally have taken more conservative positions, while Sotomayor, Kagan, and Jackson have generally taken more liberal positions. Roberts has also served as a swing vote, often advocating for narrow rulings and compromise among the two blocs of justices. Though the Court sometimes does divide along partisan lines, attorney and SCOTUSblog founder Tom Goldstein has noted that more cases are decided 9–0 and that the individual justices hold a wide array of views. A 2026 statistical analysis of Roberts' Court rulings have shown them to be substantially to the right of the average American voter.

Although Roberts is identified as having a conservative judicial philosophy, his vote in National Federation of Independent Business v. Sebelius (2012) upholding the constitutionality of the Patient Protection and Affordable Care Act (ACA) has caused reflection in the press concerning the comparative standing of his conservative judicial philosophy compared to other sitting justices of conservative orientation; he is seen as having a more moderate conservative orientation, particularly when his vote to uphold the ACA is compared to Rehnquist's vote in Bush v. Gore. Some commentators have also noted that Roberts uses his vote in high-profile cases to achieve a facially-neutral result that sets up for larger conservative rulings in the future. The Five Four Podcast went so far as to deem this maneuver the "Roberts Two-Step."

Regarding Roberts' contemporaneous peers on the bench, his judicial philosophy is seen as more moderate and conciliatory than that of Samuel Alito and Clarence Thomas. Roberts has not indicated any particularly enhanced reading of originalism or framer's intentions as has been plainly evident in Scalia's speeches and writings. Roberts' voting pattern is most closely aligned with Brett Kavanaugh's. After Ginsburg was replaced by Barrett, several commentators wrote that Roberts was no longer the leading justice. As the five other conservative justices could outvote the rest, he supposedly could no longer preside over a moderately conservative course while respecting precedent. Some said this view was confirmed by the court's 2022 ruling in Dobbs v. Jackson Women's Health Organization, which overturned the landmark rulings Roe v. Wade and Planned Parenthood v. Casey of 1973 and 1992, respectively.

The conservative bloc is sometimes further split into a wing more hesitant to overrule precedent (Roberts, Kavanaugh, and Barrett), and a wing more willing to overrule precedent (Clarence Thomas, Samuel Alito, and Neil Gorsuch). Roberts wrote the majority opinion in West Virginia v. EPA which officially established the major questions doctrine and restricted the ability of the EPA to regulate power plant emissions using generation shifting under the Clean Air Act. That opinion drew ire from critics who argued that Roberts and the conservative bloc manufactured a doctrine to thwart climate reforms.

== Criticism ==
Since 2022, criticism of the Court by Democrats has risen, who have increasingly viewed the Court as being illegitimate and partisan. The Court's legitimacy has also been questioned by its liberal bloc of justices, as well as the general public. In 2022, Aaron Regunberg in The New Republic criticized the Roberts Court for playing Calvinball, a game with no rules except for those made up as they go, with respect to its constitutional law decisions. Certain members of the Roberts Court reportedly deeply dislike each other. In particular, Justices Alito and Kagan have often criticized one other in personal terms. Justices Barrett and Jackson have also criticized the other's opinions in scathing terms. Journalist Joan Biskupic argues that Donald Trump has had the greatest impact on the Court. Biskupic argues the Court was transformed and politically polarized by him just as much as the rest of American politics. Trump's late sister, Maryanne Trump Barry (1937–2023), was a federal judge herself on the Third Circuit and in 2006 had testified before the U.S. Senate Judiciary Committee in support of the nomination of her then-colleague Samuel Alito to the Supreme Court.

In a July 2022 research paper entitled "The Supreme Court's Role in the Degradation of U.S. Democracy," the Campaign Legal Center, founded by Republican Trevor Potter, asserted that the Roberts Court "has turned on our democracy" and was on an "anti-democratic crusade" that had "accelerated and become increasingly extreme with the arrival" of Trump's three appointees. Ian Millhiser argues that the Roberts Court is akin to the Fuller Court or the Hughes Court in its reactionary decisions. Accusations of democratic backsliding have increased since the 2026 decision Louisiana v. Callais kicked off a wave of redistricting efforts, especially after the Court disregarded its previous Purcell principle and instead allowed Alabama to use legislature-drawn maps immediately, despite the fact that early voting in state primaries had already started.

== Public opinion ==
The Roberts Court is considered to be the most unpopular Court since Gallup started tracking public approval of the Supreme Court in 1973. Public perception of the Court was at a net negative before the overturning of Roe v. Wade in 2022, and dropped further following the ruling. An NPR/PBS NewsHour/Marist poll indicated that allegations of Clarence Thomas having broken the Court's code of conduct repeatedly eroded trust in the Court further, with public confidence dropping from 59% in 2018 to 37% in 2023. A 2024 survey by Marquette Law School found the court to have a 40% approval rating. In the exit poll for the 2024 presidential election, 59% of voters surveyed expressed disapproval of the Court. As of February 2025, the public approval of the Supreme Court was found to have increased to 51%, as polled by Marquette Law School. However, a subsequent Gallup poll conducted in July 2025 found that the Court's approval rating had dropped to 39% and that the partisan gap in the Court's approval rating was the largest ever recorded by Gallup. A Marquette Law School poll conducted in October 2025 found the Court's approval rating at 42%, reflecting continued polarization and mixed public sentiment following the 2024 election.

== List of Roberts Court opinions ==
- Supreme Court opinions during the 2005 term
- Supreme Court opinions during the 2006 term
- Supreme Court opinions during the 2007 term
- Supreme Court opinions during the 2008 term
- Supreme Court opinions during the 2009 term
- Supreme Court opinions during the 2010 term
- Supreme Court opinions during the 2011 term
- Supreme Court opinions during the 2012 term
- Supreme Court opinions during the 2013 term
- Supreme Court opinions during the 2014 term
- Supreme Court opinions during the 2015 term
- Supreme Court opinions during the 2016 term
- Supreme Court opinions during the 2017 term
- Supreme Court opinions during the 2018 term
- Supreme Court opinions during the 2019 term
- Supreme Court opinions during the 2020 term
- Supreme Court opinions during the 2021 term
- Supreme Court opinions during the 2022 term
- Supreme Court opinions during the 2023 term
- Supreme Court opinions during the 2024 term
- Supreme Court opinions during the 2025 term

== Gallery ==
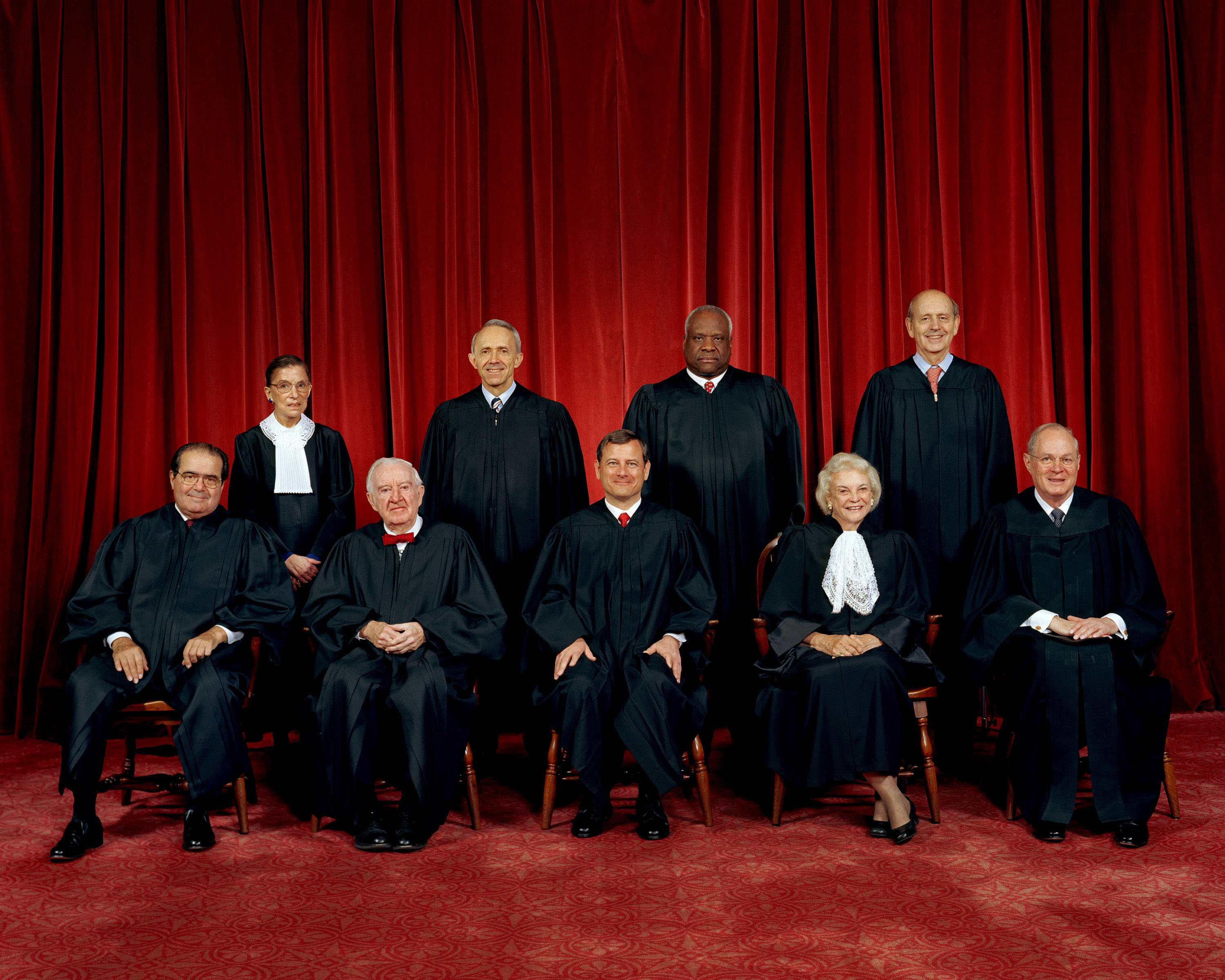
Roberts Court (September 29, 2005 – January 31, 2006)

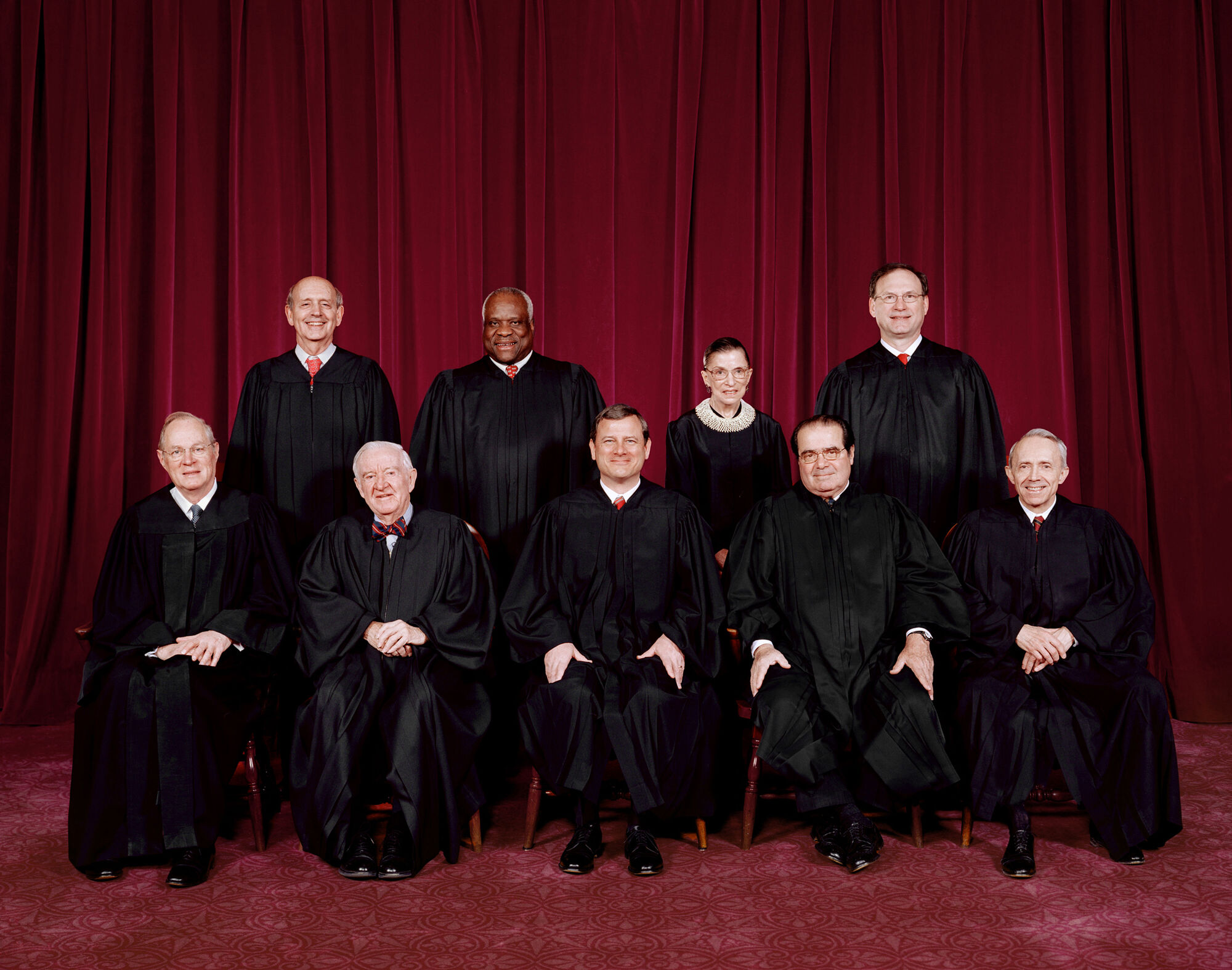
Roberts Court (January 31, 2006 – June 29, 2009)

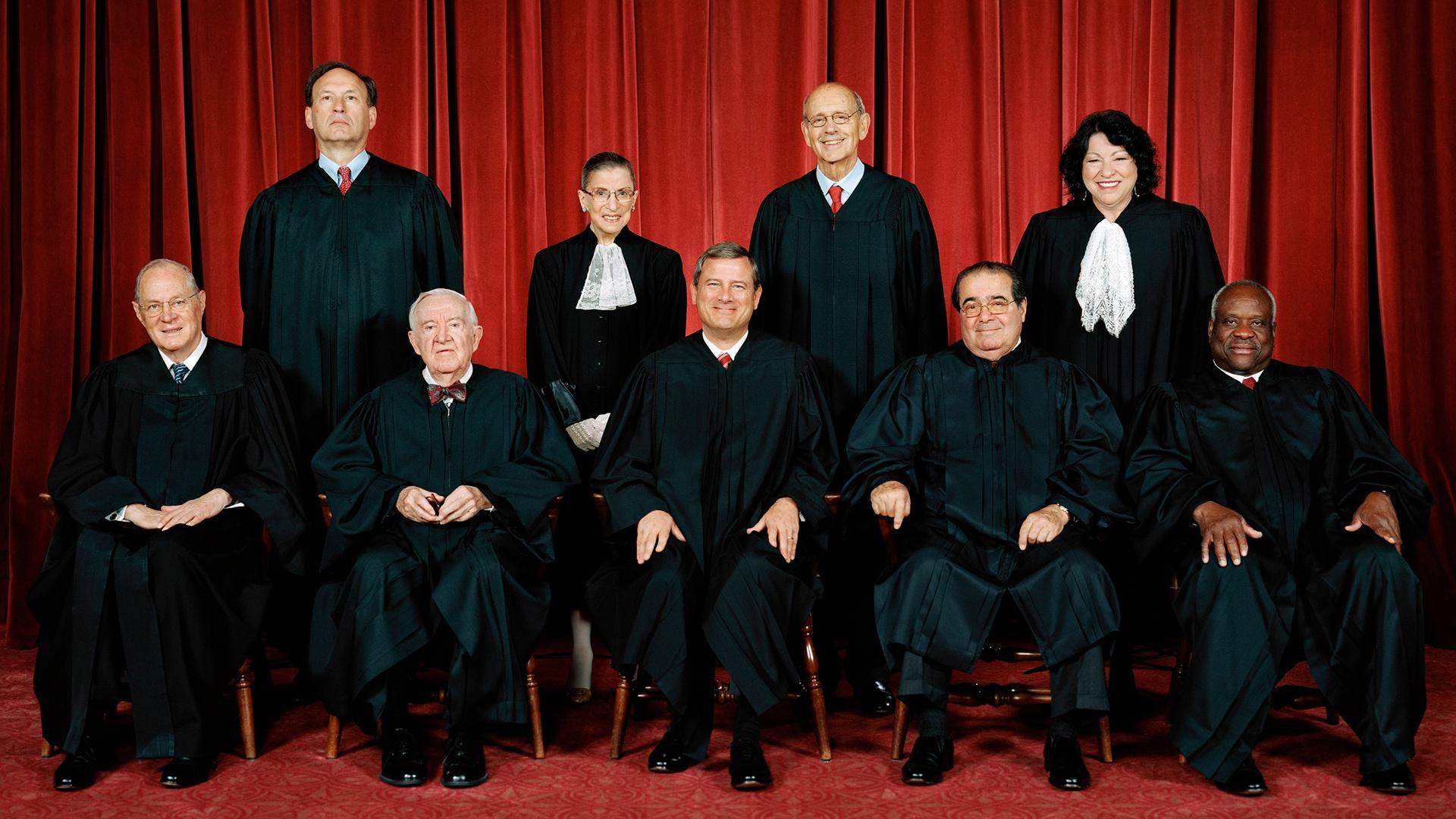
Roberts Court (August 8, 2009 – June 29, 2010)

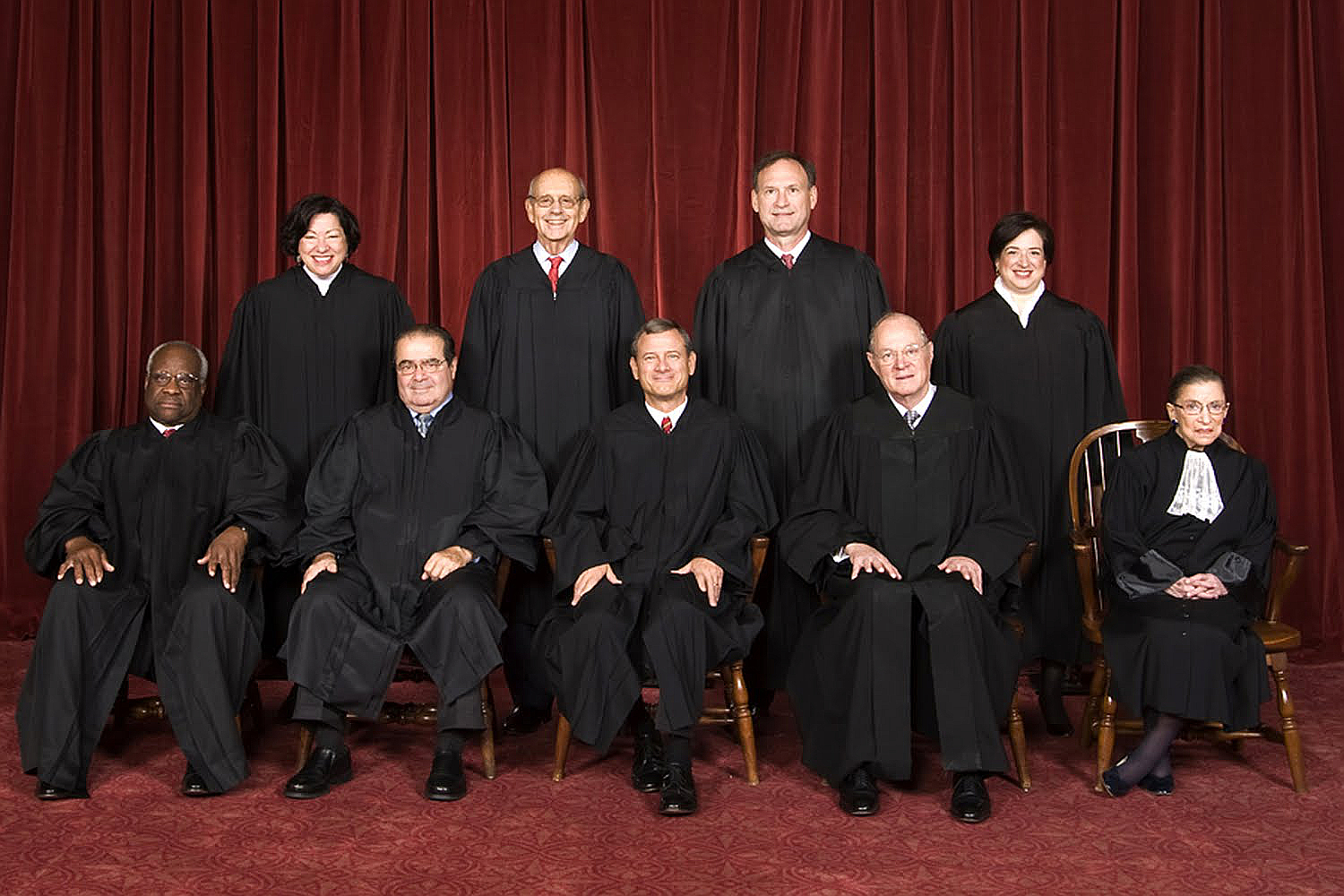
Roberts Court (August 7, 2010 – February 13, 2016)

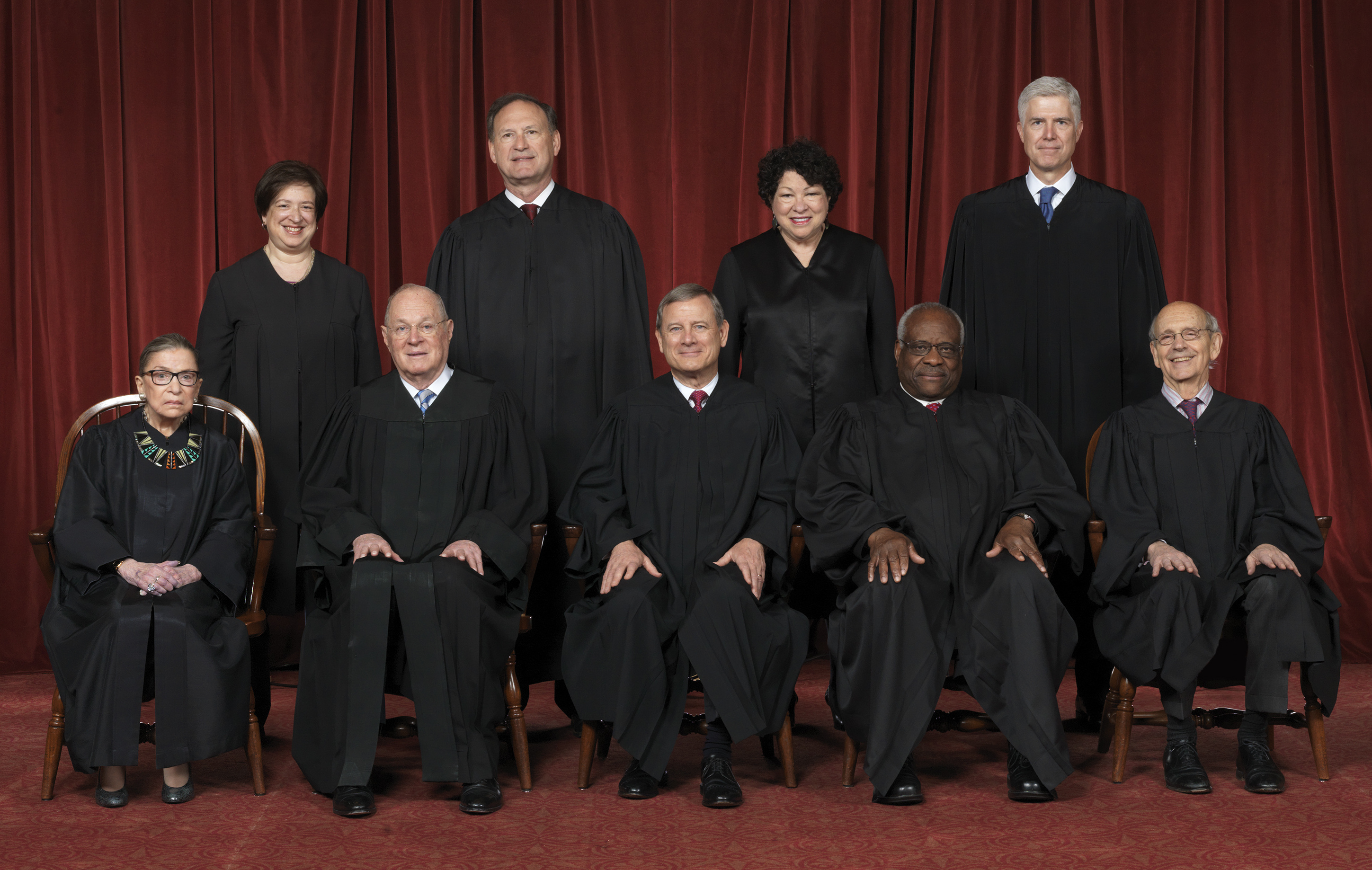
Roberts Court (April 10, 2017 – July 31, 2018)

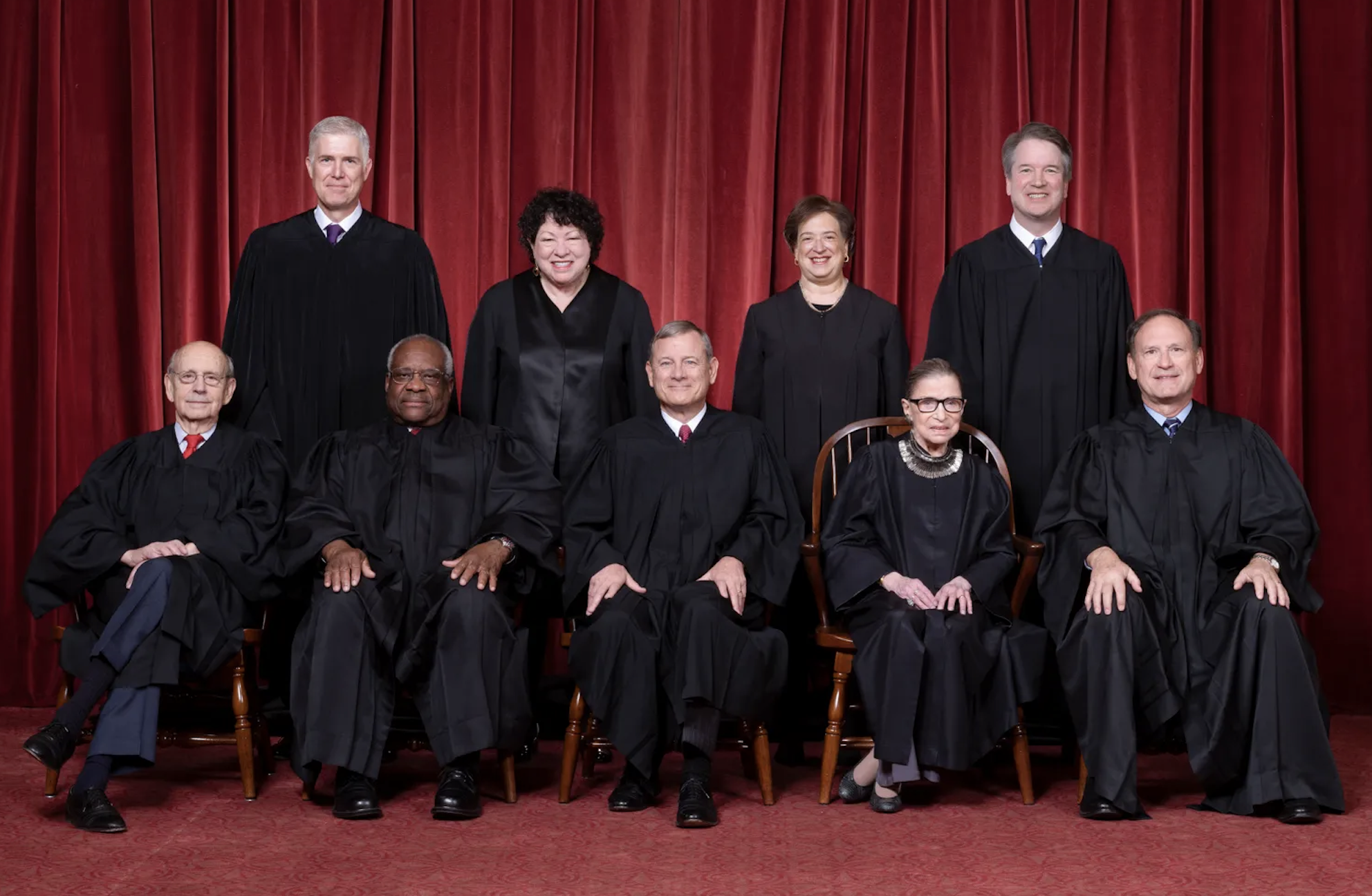
Roberts Court (October 6, 2018 – September 18, 2020)

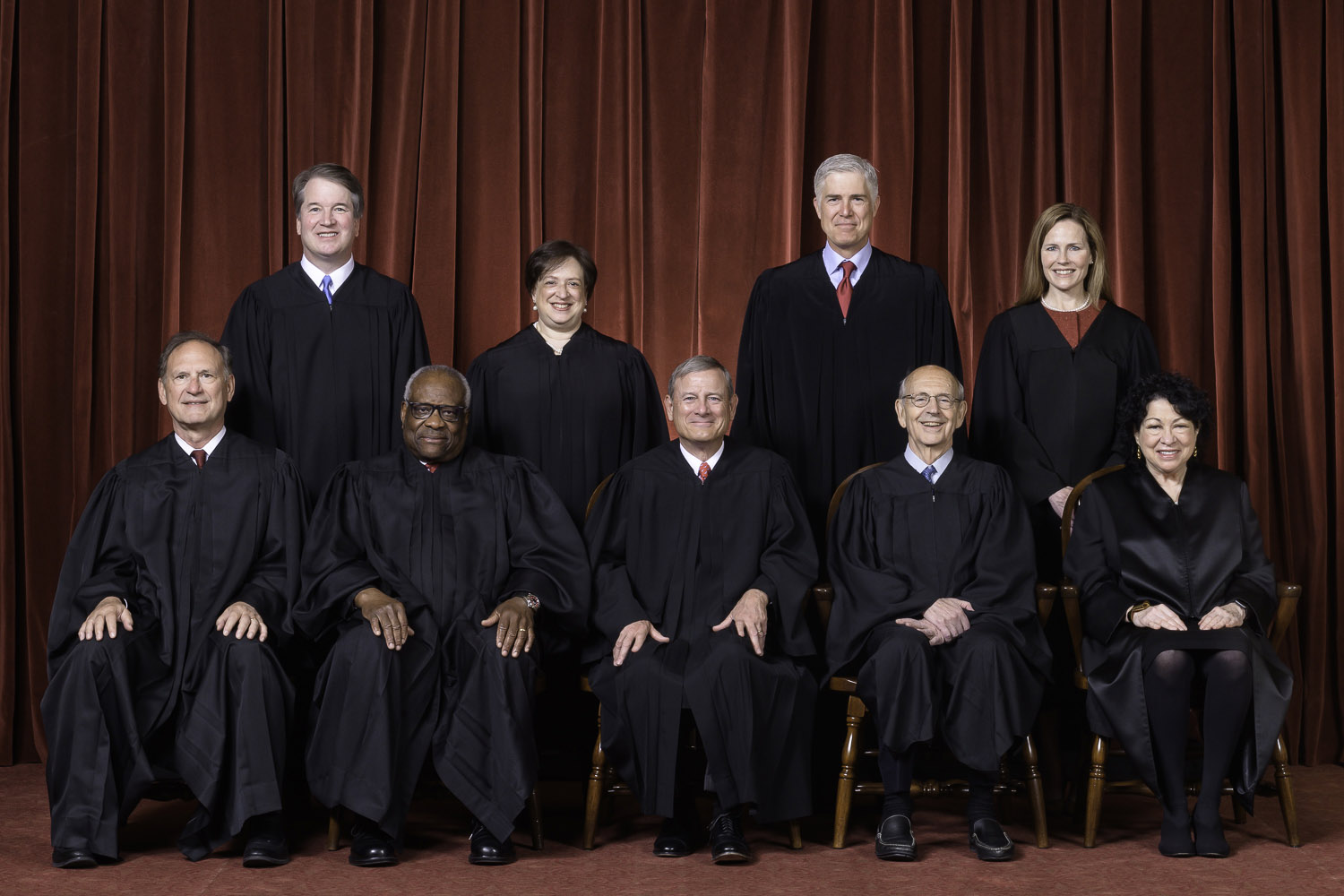
Roberts Court (October 27, 2020 – June 30, 2022)

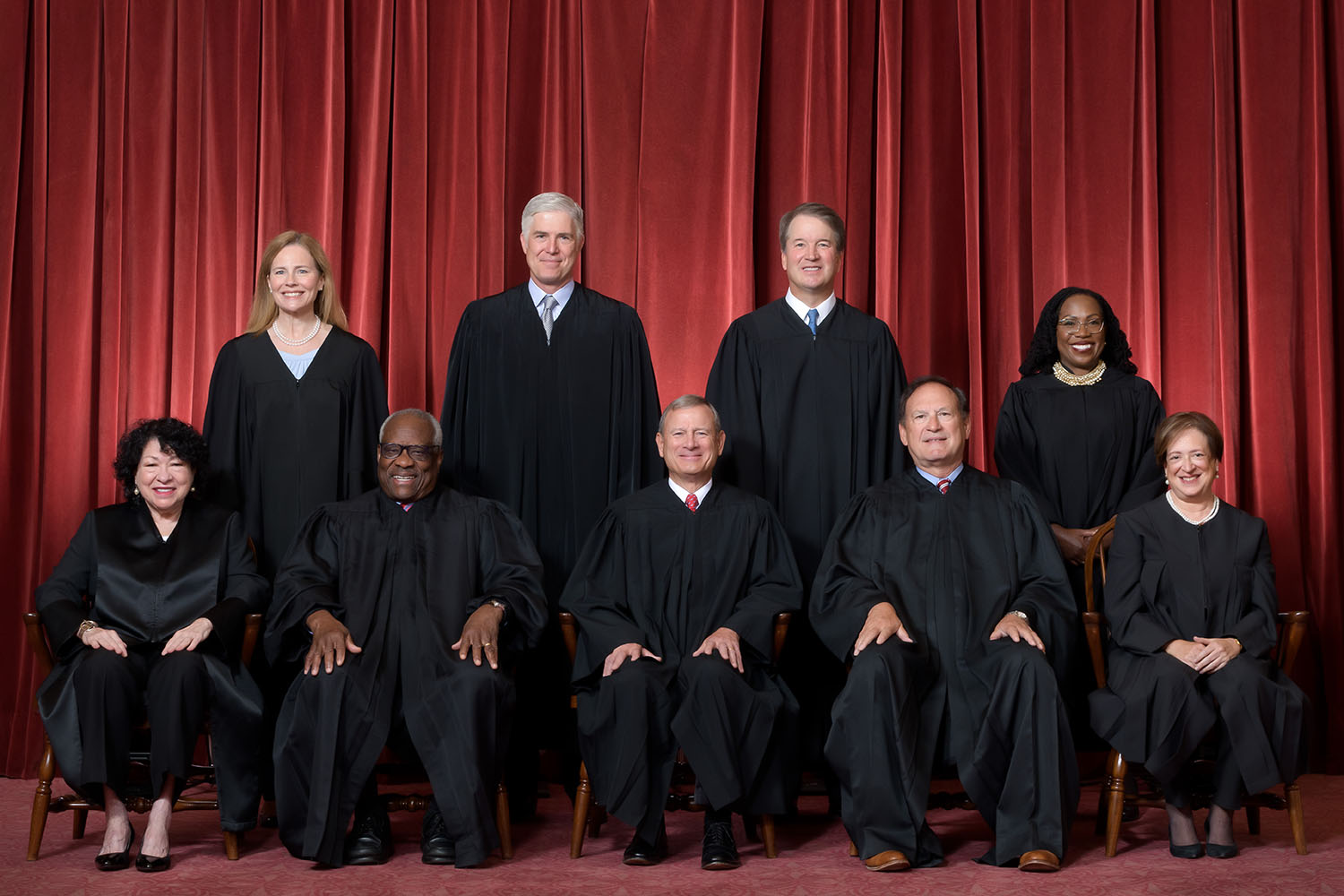
Roberts Court (June 30, 2022 – present)
