= Pleading (United States) =

Pleading in United States Federal courts is governed by the Federal Rules of Civil Procedure.

According to Rule 7, only these pleadings are allowed:

- A complaint;
- An answer to a complaint;
- An answer to a counterclaim designated as a counterclaim;
- An answer to a crossclaim;
- A third-party complaint;
- An answer to a third-party complaint; and
- If the court orders one, a reply to an answer.

Any other document that requests a court order is referred to as a motion.

== Notice pleading ==
Notice pleading is the dominant form of pleading used in the United States today. In 1938, the Federal Rules of Civil Procedure were adopted. One goal of these rules was to relax the strict rules of code pleading.

The focus of the cause of action was shifted to discovery (another goal of the FRCP). Under the Federal Rules, a plaintiff's complaint merely needs to contain a short and plain statement of their cause of action. All additional information in regards to the cause of action are handled through discovery. The idea is that a plaintiff and their attorney who have a reasonable but not perfect case can file a complaint first, put the other side on notice of the lawsuit, and then strengthen their case by compelling the defendant to produce evidence during the discovery phase.

The FRCP does not entirely eliminate code pleading. The FRCP still requires that certain pleadings state facts with particularity. An example is Federal Rule 9(b) which states that "in alleging fraud or mistake, a party must state with particularity the circumstances constituting fraud or mistake". This is considered a special pleading rule. The purpose of this rule is to help prevent a person from abusing the judicial process to defame another without spelling out the specific circumstances surrounding the alleged fraud. Additional special pleading rules are set out in Rule 9 of the Federal Rules of Civil Procedure.

The leniency of the modern notice pleading system sometimes resulted in poorly-drafted complaints with vaguely phrased, incoherent and conclusory allegations. The Supreme Court eventually responded in 2007 with a decision in Bell Atlantic Corp. v. Twombly, and again in 2009 with a decision in Ashcroft v. Iqbal, which together imposed new standards for specificity and "plausibility" in pleadings.

Iqbal reaffirmed and broadened Twombly's ruling that a court need not accept a "legal conclusion couched as a factual allegation" or "naked assertions devoid of further factual enhancement". In Twombly and Iqbal, the U.S. Supreme Court sought to clarify the deceptively simple mandate of Federal Rules of Civil Procedure 8(a)(2), which states that a "pleading that states a claim for relief must contain...a short and plain statement of the claim showing that the pleader is entitle to relief[.]"

The Court interpreted Rule 8(a)(2) in Twombly to mean that a complaint must contain sufficient factual allegations to allow a district court to find that the claim is plausible. The Twombly court criticized the modern notice pleading standard derived from the landmark 1957 Conley v. Gibson decision, which had ruled that a complaint should not be dismissed at the pleading stage, "unless it appears beyond doubt that the plaintiff can prove no set of facts in support of his claim which would entitle him to relief".

It is still not clear whether Iqbal will reduce federal court caseloads by allowing frivolous or weak lawsuits to be thrown out at the pleading stage, prior to the commencement of potentially expensive discovery. The Twombly and Iqbal decisions (often referred to collectively as Twiqbal) have the potential of denying plaintiffs with meritorious claims their day in court by raising insurmountable hurdles at the pleading stage.
