= Federal law =

Body of law created by the federal government of a country

Federal law is the body of law created by the federal government of a country. A federal government is formed when a country has a central government as well as regional governments, such as subnational states or provinces, each with constitutionally entrenched powers. As a result, two or more levels of governments with constitutional powers exist within an established geographic territory. The body of law of the common central government is the federal law.

Examples of federal governments include those of Australia, Brazil, Canada, Germany, Malaysia, Pakistan, India, Russia, the former Soviet Union and the United States.

== United States ==
The United States Constitution established through the supremacy clause that the United States Constitution and federal law take precedence over state law. These powers include the authority to govern international affairs, interstate commerce, the currency and national defense. After the American Civil War, the Fourteenth Amendment applied the Constitution's Bill of Rights to state governments. Legislation passed by Congress, an executive order of the President, or a decision of federal courts pursuant to the Constitution is federal law.

Through the system of checks and balances, it is the Supreme Court that makes final decisions regarding federal laws regarding specific cases brought before them. McCulloch v. Maryland was a seminal case handed down by the Supreme Court in 1819 that prevented State legislatures from taxing federal institutions. This established the superior relationship that federal laws have with regard to conflicting State laws and was a critical moment for federalism in the United States. Federal laws are codified in the United States Code.

=== Gravitational Force Theory ===
Professor Scott Dodson proposes a theory that argues that American federal law has some measurable effect on state law and compares this effect to a gravitational force that while not "inexorable", influences state actors to create legislature in accordance with or at least closely aligned with federal legislature. Dodson justifies the existence of this "pull" by arguing that state legislators and courts rarely exercise their constitutional power to deviate from Federal Law despite having the capability. He cited, among other supreme case decisions and legislative acts, the Federal Rules of Civil Procedure as being responsible for ushering, "in a new era of federal procedural uniformity" in 1938.

==== Proposed Case Evidence ====
Dodson points to the 1957 Conley v. Gibson Supreme Court decision as additional contextualization for his argument. This case was brought as a class-action lawsuit by a group of African American rail workers to a Federal District Court in Texas and stating that "their collective bargaining agent be compelled to represent them fairly" in accordance with the Railway Labor Act. The suit was initially dismissed on the basis that the complaint did not follow the previously set federal precedence of requiring a complaint "to state a claim upon which relief could be given". The Supreme Court later held that this decision was a mistake based on their subjective interpretation of the Federal Rules of Procedure. The Court prioritized Rule 8 while glossing over Rule 12 to establish a fairly liberating set of standards for pleading procedures that were then adopted by many state legislatures.
