= Petition =

Written request, e.g. to a government

A petition is a request to do something, most commonly addressed to a government official or public entity. Petitions to a deity are a form of prayer called supplication.

In the colloquial sense, a petition is a document addressed to an official and signed by numerous individuals. A petition may be oral rather than written, or may be transmitted via the Internet.

== Legal ==
Petition can also be the title of a legal pleading that initiates a legal case. The initial pleading in a civil lawsuit that seeks only money (damages) might be called (in most U.S. courts) a complaint. An initial pleading in a lawsuit that seeks non-monetary or "equitable" relief, such as a request for a writ of mandamus or habeas corpus, custody of a child, or probate of a will, is instead called a petition.

Act on petition is a "summary process" used in probate, ecclesiastical and divorce cases, designed to handle matters which are too complex for simple motion. The parties in a case exchange pleadings until a cause for a hearing is settled. Black's Law Dictionary specifies it as an obsolete method used in admiralty cases. In the United States, the "act on petition" has been used in maritime cases.

== Early history ==
The first documented petitions were made by slaves building pyramids in Ancient Egypt who petitioned for better working conditions.

In pre-modern Imperial China petitions were always sent to an Office of Transmission (Tongzheng si or 通政司) where court secretaries read petitions aloud to the emperor. Petitions could be sent by anybody, from a scholar-official to a common farmer, although the petitions were more likely read to the emperor if they were persuasive enough to impeach questionable and corrupt local officials from office. When petitions arrived to the throne, multiple copies were made of the original and stored with the Office of Supervising Secretaries before the original written petition was sent to the emperor.

Inhabitants of the Ottoman Empire, as individuals and as groups, had the right to petition local representatives of the empire or to petition the sultan directly. In the capital city of Istanbul, a bureau influenced by the one that had existed in Byzantine Constantinople tracked and archived all petitions along with any annotations and administrative actions related to them. Beginning in the early 1740s, petitions were separated from other affairs and recorded in a unique archive. Hundreds of thousands of petitions were archived in Istanbul between the 15th and 20th centuries. By the early 16th century, a large portion of day-to-day decisions were made in response to petitions. Negotiations between city leaders and the empire often used petitions; this practice continued into the Tanzimat period. These negotiations contributed to the development of jurisprudence.

The emergence of petitioning during the reign of Edward I of England (1272-1307) contributed to beginnings of legislative power for the Parliament of England. Petitions became a common form of protest and request to the British House of Commons in the 18th and 19th centuries; one million petitions were submitted to the UK's parliament between 1780 and 1918. The largest was the Great/People's Charter, or petition of the Chartists.

The Petition Clause of the First Amendment to the U.S. Constitution guarantees the right of the people "to petition the Government for a redress of grievances." The right to petition has been held to include the right to file lawsuits against the government.

== Modern use ==
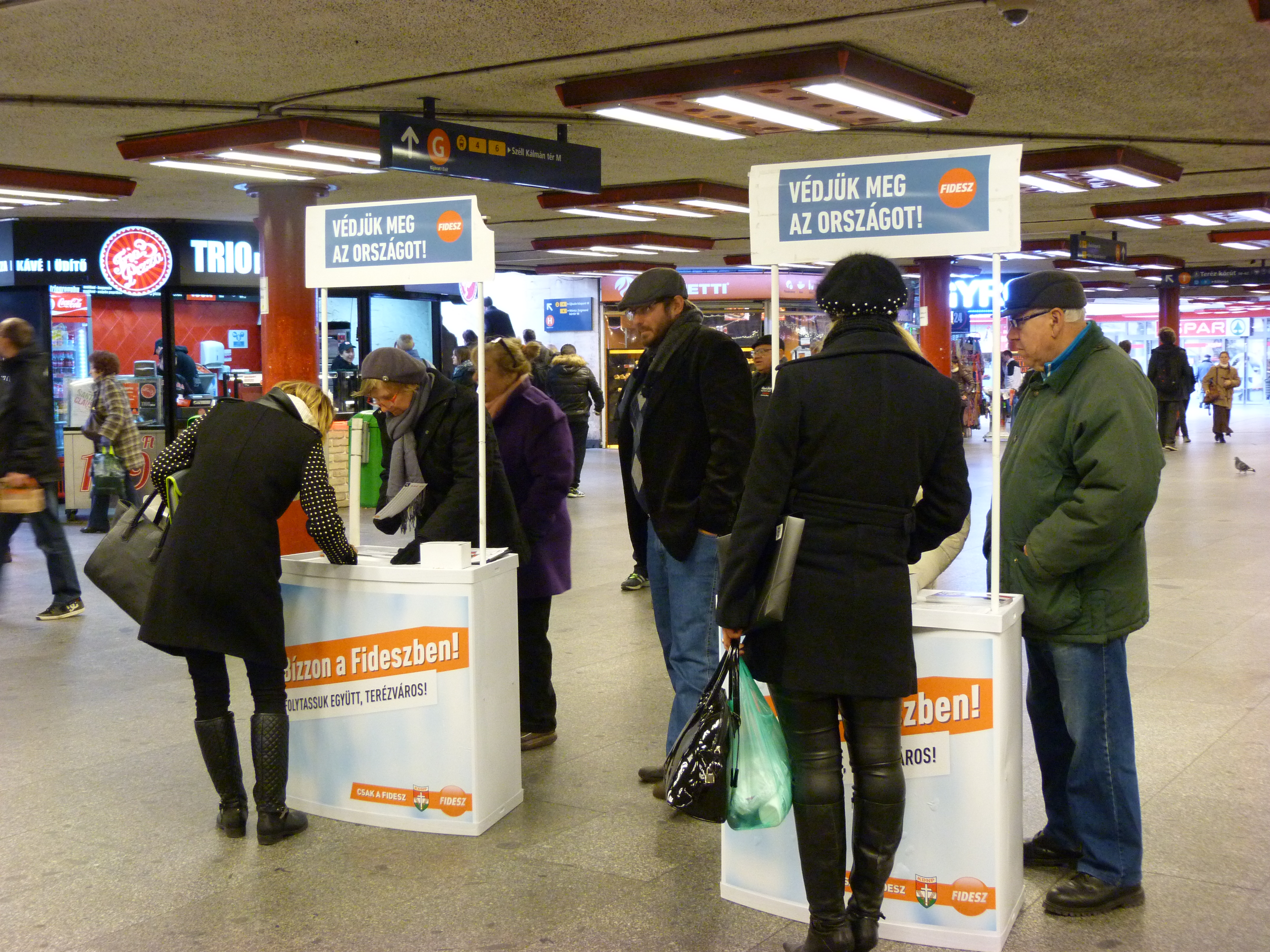
Petition – Budapest, November 26, 2015

Petitions are commonly used in the U.S. to qualify candidates for public office to appear on a ballot; while anyone can be a write-in candidate, a candidate desiring that his or her name appear on printed ballots and other official election materials must gather a certain number of valid signatures from registered voters. In jurisdictions whose laws allow for ballot initiatives, the gathering of a sufficient number of voter signatures qualifies a proposed initiative to be placed on the ballot. The 2003 California recall election, which culminated in the recall of Governor Gray Davis and the election of Arnold Schwarzenegger, began when U.S. Representative Darrell Issa employed paid signature gatherers who obtained millions of signatures at a cost to Issa of millions of dollars. Once the requisite number of signatures was obtained on the recall petition, other petitions were circulated by would-be candidates who wanted to appear on the ballot as possible replacements for Davis. After that step, a vote on the recall was scheduled.

Other types of petitions include those that sought to free Nelson Mandela during his imprisonment by the former apartheid government of South Africa. The petitions had no legal effect, but the signatures of millions of people on the petitions represented a moral force that may have helped free Mandela and end apartheid. Non-governmental organizations such as Amnesty International often use petitions in an attempt to exert moral authority in support of various causes. Other nongovernmental subjects of petition drives include corporate personnel decisions. In the United Kingdom, a petition to the parliament in 1990 against ambulance service cuts attracted 4.5 million signatures. Today, petitions in Britain are often presented through the UK Parliament petitions website, the forerunner of which was set up in 2006. Such online petitions are a new form of a petition becoming commonplace in the 21st century. Change.org was founded in 2007 and became the world's most popular online petition platform with around 50 million registered users. OpenPetition, with over 7 million users, was founded in 2010 with the goal of promoting civic participation through online petitions.

Recent research by the sociocultural psychologist, Chana Etengoff, has highlighted the therapeutic benefits of petitioning including meaning-making, social action, agency and empowerment.

== See also ==
- City council
- Motion (legal)
- Motion for leave
- Online petition
- Popular initiative
- Right to petition
- Special Leave Petitions in India
