= Swanson v. Citibank N.A. =

Discrimination law and US civil procedure case

- Court: United States Court of Appeals for the Seventh Circuit

Keywords
- Preemption

Swanson v. Citibank N.A. 614 F 3d 400 (2010) is a discrimination law and US civil procedure case, concerning the scope of federal preemption against state law for labor rights.

== Facts ==
Gloria Swanson claimed Citibank had committed race discrimination in her application for a home equity loan, because their home value appraiser unjustifiably devalued her property as she was African-American under the Fair Housing Act, 42 USC §3605, and the Equal Credit Opportunity Act, 15 USC §1691(a)(1). Citibank had received money from the Troubled Asset Relief Program to put money into home equity, in order to prop up the housing market after the sub-prime mortgage crisis. Swanson had visited the bank, and was told she should apply along with her husband. She had refused to answer a question about race, but the bank employee pointed to a photo of his family who were part African-American also. Swanson disclosed that Washington Mutual Bank previously had denied her a home-equity loan. After Swanson applied to the bank, a preliminary home valuation was $240,000. Then an appraiser, Andre Lanier who worked for PCI Appraisal Services, visited the home and valued it at $170,000. After Swanson claimed, Citibank brought a motion to dismiss the claim under the Federal Rules of Civil Procedure Rule 12(b)(6), that the grounds were too indefinite and unreasonable.

== Judgment ==
Wood J, joined by Easterbook J, allowed the claim to proceed.

Before turning to the particulars of Swanson's case, a brief review of the standards that apply to dismissals for failure to state a claim is in order. It is by now well established that a plaintiff must do better than putting a few words on paper that, in the hands of an imaginative reader, might suggest that something has happened to her that might be redressed by the law. Cf. Conley v. Gibson, 355 U.S. 41, 45-46, 78 S.Ct. 99, 2 L.Ed.2d 80 (1957), disapproved by Bell Atlantic Corp. v. Twombly, 550 U.S. 544, 563, 127 S.Ct. 1955, 167 L.Ed.2d 929 (2007) ("after puzzling the profession for 50 years, this famous observation [the `no set of facts' language] has earned its retirement"). The question with which courts are still struggling is how much higher the Supreme Court meant to set the bar, when it decided not only Twombly, but also Erickson v. Pardus, 551 U.S. 89, 127 S.Ct. 2197, 167 L.Ed.2d 1081 (2007), and Ashcroft v. Iqbal, ___ U.S. ___, 129 S.Ct. 1937, 173 L.Ed.2d 868 (2009). This is not an easy question to answer, as the thoughtful dissent from this opinion demonstrates. On the one hand, the Supreme Court has adopted a "plausibility" standard, but on the other hand, it has insisted that it is not requiring fact pleading, nor is it adopting a single pleading standard to replace Rule 8, Rule 9, and specialized regimes like the one in the Private Securities Litigation Reform Act ("PSLRA"), 15 U.S.C. § 78u-4(b)(2).

Critically, in none of the three recent decisions — Twombly, Erickson, or Iqbal — did the Court cast any doubt on the validity of Rule 8 of the Federal Rules of Civil Procedure. To the contrary: at all times it has said that it is interpreting Rule 8, not tossing it out the window. It is therefore useful to begin with a look at the language of the rule:

(a) Claim for Relief. A pleading that states a claim for relief must contain:

(2) a short and plain statement of the claim showing that the pleader is entitled to relief....

FED.R.CIV.P. 8(a)(2). As one respected treatise put it in 2004,

all that is necessary is that the claim for relief be stated with brevity, conciseness, and clarity.... [T]his portion of Rule 8 indicates that a basic objective of the rules is to avoid civil cases turning on technicalities and to require that the pleading discharge the function of giving the opposing party fair notice of the nature and basis or grounds of the pleader's claim and a general indication of the type of litigation that is involved....

5 CHARLES A. WRIGHT & ARTHUR R. MILLER, FEDERAL PRACTICE AND PROCEDURE § 1215 at 165-173 (3d ed. 2004).

Nothing in the recent trio of cases has undermined these broad principles. As Erickson underscored, "[s]pecific facts are not necessary." 551 U.S. at 93, 127 S.Ct. 2197. The Court was not engaged in a sub rosa campaign to reinstate the old fact-pleading system called for by the Field Code or even more modern codes. We know that because it said so in Erickson: "the statement need only give the defendant fair notice of what the ... claim is and the grounds upon which it rests." Id. Instead, the Court has called for more careful attention to be given to several key questions: what, exactly, does it take to give the opposing party "fair notice"; how much detail realistically can be given, and should be given, about the nature and basis or grounds of the claim; and in what way is the pleader expected to signal the type of litigation that is being put before the court?

This is the light in which the Court's references in Twombly, repeated in Iqbal, to the pleader's responsibility to "state a claim to relief that is plausible on its face" must be understood. See Twombly, 550 U.S. at 570, 127 S.Ct. 1955; Iqbal, 129 S.Ct. at 1949. "Plausibility" in this context does not imply that the district court should decide whose version to believe, or which version is more likely than not. Indeed, the Court expressly distanced itself from the latter approach in Iqbal, "the plausibility standard is not akin to a probability requirement." 129 S.Ct. at 1949 (quotation marks omitted). As we understand it, the Court is saying instead that the plaintiff must give enough details about the subject-matter of the case to present a story that holds together. In other words, the court will ask itself could these things have happened, not did they happen. For cases governed only by Rule 8, it is not necessary to stack up inferences side by side and allow the case to go forward only if the plaintiff's inferences seem more compelling than the opposing inferences. Compare Makor Issues & Rights, Ltd. v. Tellabs Inc., 513 F.3d 702, 705 (7th Cir.2008) (applying PSLRA standards).

The Supreme Court's explicit decision to reaffirm the validity of Swierkiewicz v. Sorema N.A., 534 U.S. 506, 122 S.Ct. 992, 152 L.Ed.2d 1 (2002), which was cited with approval in Twombly, 550 U.S. at 556, 127 S.Ct. 1955, indicates that in many straightforward cases, it will not be any more difficult today for a plaintiff to meet that burden than it was before the Court's recent decisions. A plaintiff who believes that she has been passed over for a promotion because of her sex will be able to plead that she was employed by Company X, that a promotion was offered, that she applied and was qualified for it, and that the job went to someone else. That is an entirely plausible scenario, whether or not it describes what "really" went on in this plaintiff's case. A more complex case involving financial derivatives, or tax fraud that the parties tried hard to conceal, or antitrust violations, will require more detail, both to give the opposing party notice of what the case is all about and to show how, in the plaintiff's mind at least, the dots should be connected. Finally, as the Supreme Court warned in Iqbal and as we acknowledged later in Brooks v. Ross, 578 F.3d 574 (7th Cir.2009), "abstract recitations of the elements of a cause of action or conclusory legal statements," 578 F.3d at 581, do nothing to distinguish the particular case that is before the court from every other hypothetically possible case in that field of law. Such statements therefore do not add to the notice that Rule 8 demands.

We realize that one powerful reason that lies behind the Supreme Court's concern about pleading standards is the cost of the discovery that will follow in any case that survives a motion to dismiss on the pleadings. The costs of discovery are often asymmetric, as the dissent points out, and one way to rein them in would be to make it more difficult to earn the right to engage in discovery. That is just what the Court did, by interring the rule that a complaint could go forward if any set of facts at all could be imagined, consistent with the statements in the complaint, that would permit the pleader to obtain relief. Too much chaff was moving ahead with the wheat. But, in other contexts, the Supreme Court has drawn a careful line between those things that can be accomplished by judicial interpretation and those that should be handled through the procedures set up in the Rules Enabling Act, 28 U.S.C. § 2071 et seq. See Mohawk Indus., Inc. v. Carpenter, ___ U.S. ___, 130 S.Ct. 599, 609, 175 L.Ed.2d 458 (2009). In fact, the Judicial Conference's Advisory Committee on Civil Rules is engaged in an intensive study of pleading rules, discovery practice, and the costs of litigation, as its recent 2010 Civil Litigation Conference, held at Duke Law School May 10–11, 2010, demonstrates. See Summary of 2010 Conference on Civil Litigation at Duke Law School, University of Denver Institute for the Advancement of the American Legal System, at http://www.du.edu/ legalinstitute/pdf/DukeConference.pdf (last visited July 28, 2010).

Returning to Swanson's case, we must analyze her allegations defendant-by-defendant. We begin with Citibank. On appeal, Swanson challenges only the dismissal of her Fair Housing Act and fraud claims. The Fair Housing Act prohibits businesses engaged in residential real estate transactions, including "[t]he making... of loans or providing other financial assistance ... secured by residential real estate," from discriminating against any person on account of race. 42 U.S.C. § 3605(a), (b)(1)(B). Swanson's complaint identifies the type of discrimination that she thinks occurs (racial), by whom (Citibank, through Skertich, the manager, and the outside appraisers it used), and when (in connection with her effort in early 2009 to obtain a home-equity loan). This is all that she needed to put in the complaint. See Swierkiewicz, 534 U.S. at 511-12, 122 S.Ct. 992 (employment discrimination); see also Fritz v. Charter Twp. of Comstock, 592 F.3d 718, 723-24 (6th Cir.2010); Comm. Concerning Cmty. Improvement v. City of Modesto, 583 F.3d 690, 715 (9th Cir.2009).

The fact that Swanson included other, largely extraneous facts in her complaint does not undermine the soundness of her pleading. She points to Citibank's announced plan to use federal money to make more loans, its refusal to follow through in her case, and Skertich's comment that he has a mixed-race family. She has not pleaded herself out of court by mentioning these facts; whether they are particularly helpful for proving her case or not is another matter that can safely be put off for another day. It was therefore error for the district court to dismiss Swanson's Fair Housing Act claim against Citibank.

Her fraud claim against Citibank stands on a different footing. Rule 9(b) of the Federal Rules of Civil Procedure provides that "[i]n alleging fraud or mistake, a party must state with particularity the circumstances constituting fraud or mistake. Malice, intent, knowledge, and other conditions of a person's mind may be alleged generally." Of special relevance here, a plaintiff must plead actual damages arising from her reliance on a fraudulent statement. Tricontinental Indus., Ltd. v. PricewaterhouseCoopers, LLP, 475 F.3d 824, 841 (7th Cir.2007). Without a contract, only out-of-pocket losses allegedly arising from the fraud are recoverable. Roboserve, Inc. v. Kato Kagaku Co., Ltd., 78 F.3d 266, 274 (7th Cir.1996) (applying Illinois law). Swanson asserts that Citibank falsely announced plans to make federal funds available in the form of loans to all customers, when it actually intended to exclude African-American customers from those who would be eligible for the loans. Swanson relied, she says, on that false information when she applied for her home-equity loan. But she never alleged that she lost anything from the process of applying for the loan. We do not know, for example, whether there was a loan application fee, or if Citibank or she covered the cost of the appraisal. This is the kind of particular information that Rule 9 requires, and its absence means that the district court was entitled to dismiss the claim.

We now turn to Swanson's claims against Lanier and PCI. Here again, she pursues only her Fair Housing Act and fraud claims. (The appraisal defendants point out that they do not extend credit, and thus their actions are not covered in any event by the Equal Credit Opportunity Act, 15 U.S.C. § 1691a(e).) The Fair Housing Act makes it "unlawful for any person or other entity whose business includes engaging in residential real estate-related transactions to discriminate against any person in making available such a transaction, or in the terms or conditions of such a transaction, because of race...." 42 U.S.C. § 3605(a). The statute goes on to define the term "residential real estate-related transaction" to include "the selling, brokering, or appraising of residential real property." 42 U.S.C. § 3605(b)(2). There is an appraisal exemption also, found in § 4605(c), but it provides only that nothing in the statute prohibits appraisers from taking into consideration factors other than race or the other protected characteristics.

Swanson accuses the appraisal defendants of skewing their assessment of her home because of her race. It is unclear whether she believes that they did so as part of a conspiracy with Citibank, or if she thinks that they deliberately undervalued her property on their own initiative. Once again, we find that she has pleaded enough to survive a motion under Rule 12(b)(6). The appraisal defendants knew her race, and she accuses them of discriminating against her in the specific business transaction that they had with her. When it comes to proving her case, she will need to come up with more evidence than the mere fact that PCI (through Lanier) placed a far lower value on her house than Midwest Valuations did. See Latimore, 151 F.3d at 715 (need more at the summary judgment stage than evidence of a discrepancy between appraisals). All we hold now is that she is entitled to take the next step in this litigation.

Posner J dissented.

I have difficulty squaring that reversal with Ashcroft v. Iqbal, ___ U.S. ___, 129 S.Ct. 1937, 173 L.Ed.2d 868 (2009), unless Iqbal is limited to cases in which there is a defense of official immunity — especially if as in that case it is asserted by very high-ranking officials (the Attorney General of the United States and the Director of the FBI) — because the defense is compromised if the defendants have to respond to discovery demands in a case unlikely to have merit. Smith v. Duffey, 576 F.3d 336, 340 (7th Cir.2009); Robert G. Bone, "Plausibility Pleading Revisited and Revised: A Comment on Ashcroft v. Iqbal," 85 Notre Dame L.Rev. 849, 882 (2010); Howard M. Wasserman, "Iqbal, Procedural Mismatches, and Civil Rights Litigation," 14 Lewis & Clark L.Rev. 157, 172-73 (2010).

The majority opinion does not suggest that the Supreme Court would limit Iqbal to immunity cases. The Court said that "our decision in Twombly [Bell Atlantic Corp. v. Twombly, 550 U.S. 544, 127 S.Ct. 1955, 167 L.Ed.2d 929 (2007), the forerunner of Iqbal] expounded the pleading standard for `all civil actions.'" 129 S.Ct. at 1953. It did add that a district judge's promise of minimally intrusive discovery "provides especially cold comfort in this pleading context, where we are impelled to give real content to the concept of qualified immunity for high-level officials who must be neither deterred nor detracted from the vigorous performance of their duties." Id. at 1954. But this seems just to mean that the Court thought Iqbal a strong case for application of the Twombly standard, rather than thinking it the only type of discrimination case to which the standard applies.

There is language in my colleagues' opinion to suggest that discrimination cases are outside the scope of Iqbal, itself a discrimination case. The opinion says that "a plaintiff who believes that she has been passed over for a promotion because of her sex will be able to plead that she was employed by Company X, that a promotion was offered, that she applied and was qualified for it, and that the job went to someone else." Though this is not a promotion case, the opinion goes on to say that "Swanson's complaint identifies the type of discrimination that she thinks occurs (racial), by whom (Citibank, through Skertich, the manager, and the outside appraisers it used), and when (in connection with her effort in early 2009 to obtain a home equity loan). This is all that she needed to put in the complaint." In contrast, "a more complex case involving financial derivatives, or tax fraud that the parties tried hard to conceal, or antitrust violations, will require more detail, both to give the opposing party notice of what the case is all about and to show how, in the plaintiff's mind at least, the dots should be connected." The "more complex" case to which this passage is referring is Twombly, an antitrust case. But Iqbal, which charged the defendants with having subjected Pakistani Muslims to harsh conditions of confinement because of their religion and national origin, was a discrimination case, as is the present case, and was not especially complex.

Suppose this were a promotion case, and several people were vying for a promotion, all were qualified, several were men and one was a woman, and one of the men received the promotion. No complexity; yet the district court would "draw on its judicial experience and common sense," Ashcroft v. Iqbal, supra, 129 S.Ct. at 1950, to conclude that discrimination would not be a plausible explanation of the hiring decision, without additional allegations.

This case is even stronger for dismissal because it lacks the competitive situation — man and woman, or white and black, vying for the same job and the man, or the white, getting it. We had emphasized this distinction, long before Twombly and Iqbal, in Latimore v. Citibank Federal Savings Bank, 151 F.3d 712 (7th Cir.1998), like this a case of credit discrimination rather than promotion. "Latimore was not competing with a white person for a $51,000 loan. A bank does not announce, `We are making a $51,000 real estate loan today; please submit your applications, and we'll choose the application that we like best and give that applicant the loan.'" Id. at 714. We held that there was no basis for an inference of discrimination. Noland v. Commerce Mortgage Corp., 122 F.3d 551, 553 (8th Cir.1997), and Simms v. First Gibraltar Bank, 83 F.3d 1546, 1558 (5th Cir.1996), rejected credit-discrimination claims because there was no evidence that similar applicants were treated better, and Boykin v. Bank of America Corp., 162 Fed.Appx. 837, 840 (11th Cir.2005) (per curiam), rejected such a claim because "absent direct evidence of discrimination, there is no basis for a trier of fact to assume that a decision to deny a loan was motivated by discriminatory animus unless the plaintiff makes a showing that a pattern of lending suggests the existence of discrimination."

There is no allegation that the plaintiff in this case was competing with a white person for a loan. It was the low appraisal of her home that killed her chances for the $50,000 loan that she was seeking. The appraiser thought her home worth only $170,000, and she already owed $146,000 on it (a first mortgage of $121,000 and a home-equity loan of $25,000). A further loan of $50,000 would thus have been undersecured. We must assume that the appraisal was a mistake, and the house worth considerably more, as she alleges. But errors in appraising a house are common because "real estate appraisal is not an exact science," Latimore v. Citibank Federal Savings Bank, supra, 151 F.3d at 715 — common enough to have created a market for "Real Estate Appraisers Errors & Omissions" insurance policies. See, e.g., OREP (Organization of Real Estate Professionals), "E&O Insurance," www. orep.org/appraisers-e&o.htm (visited July 11, 2010). The Supreme Court would consider error the plausible inference in this case, rather than discrimination, for it said in Iqbal that "as between that `obvious alternative explanation' for the [injury of which the plaintiff is complaining] and the purposeful, invidious discrimination [the plaintiff] asks us to infer, discrimination is not a plausible conclusion." Ashcroft v. Iqbal, supra, 129 S.Ct. at 1951-52, quoting Twombly, 550 U.S. at 567, 127 S.Ct. 1955.

== See also ==
- Ashcroft v. Iqbal, 556 US 662 (2009)
- United States labor law
