= Speaking demurrer =

A speaking demurrer is an attempt to use a demurrer to challenge the factual claims of a complaint. Doing so is improper, because a demurrer assumes that all of the complaint's factual claims are true.
