= Bill of particulars =

Written statement of relevant charges in a legal case

In common law jurisdictions, a bill of particulars is a detailed, formal, written statement of charges or claims by a plaintiff or the prosecutor given upon the defendant's formal request to the court for more detailed information. A bill of particulars may be used in either criminal defense or in civil litigation.

== Use ==
In criminal law, defense attorneys may file a motion requesting a bill of particulars from prosecuting attorneys. However, prosecuting attorneys cannot request the same of the defense. This request may be part of an omnibus motion, motion in limine, or similar motion.

In a civil action such as a tort or breach of contract case, either attorney or party can request it. It is rarely used in American small claims cases. It is not entirely clear whether this can be done in practice in Britain on the Allocation questionnaire. An insufficient response to a request for a bill of particulars may be grounds for dismissal of the claim, or other sanctions against the responding party. In civil cases, a bill of particulars is a pleading, which "amplifies" the complaint, but can also act as a discovery device or tool.

== In U.S. law ==
The Federal Rules of Criminal Procedure provide in rule 7(f) that "the court may direct the government to file a bill of particulars".

In U.S. state law, the bill of particulars was abolished in nearly all court systems in the 1940s and 1950s due to the widespread recognition that much of the information requested could be obtained more efficiently through the discovery process. Today, only a minority of U.S. states, like New York, Illinois, California (CCP 454), and Virginia, use the bill of particulars, and even there motions for a bill of particulars may be disfavored or disused. In Illinois, for instance, it is more common for defendants to file a motion to dismiss under the Illinois Code of Civil Procedure § 2–615, claiming the pleaded facts to be insufficient to support the causes of action alleged. It has been observed, however, that the motion for a bill of particulars may have strategic advantages over a § 2-615 motion, because the latter, even where successful, usually results in the plaintiff being given an opportunity to refile. A bill of particulars, however, once submitted, confines the pleader to any causes of action or defenses in the bill. The closest modern equivalent, though rarely used, is the motion for more definite statement.

== See also ==
- Suitable age and discretion
