= Conley v. Gibson =

- Supreme Court of the United States

Argued October 21, 1957 Decided November 18, 1957
- Full case name: Conley v. Gibson
- Citations: 355 U.S. 41 (more) 78 S. Ct. 99; 2 L. Ed. 2d 80; 9 Fair Empl. Prac. Cas. (BNA) 439; 33 Lab. Cas. (CCH) ¶ 71,077; 1 Empl. Prac. Dec. (CCH) ¶ 9656; 41 L.R.R.M. 2089

Case history
- Prior: 229 F.2d 436 (reversed)

Holding
- General allegations of discrimination were sufficient to fulfill the Rule 8 requirement of a "short and plain statement."

Court membership
- Chief Justice Earl Warren Associate Justices Hugo Black · Felix Frankfurter; William O. Douglas · Harold H. Burton; Tom C. Clark · John M. Harlan II; William J. Brennan Jr. · Charles E. Whittaker

Case opinion
- Majority: Black, joined by unanimous

Laws applied
- Railway Labor Act; Federal Rules of Civil Procedure
- Overruled by
- Bell Atlantic Corp. v. Twombly (2007)

Conley v. Gibson, 355 U.S. 41 (1957), was a case decided by the Supreme Court of the United States that provided a basis for a broad reading of the "short and plain statement" requirement for pleading under Rule 8 of the Federal Rules of Civil Procedure. Conley was overturned in Bell Atlantic Corp. v. Twombly (2007) and Ashcroft v. Iqbal (2009), which imposed a higher plausibility standard.

== Opinion of the Court ==
The case arose from an alleged wrongful discharge of African-American employees from a railroad company and unequal protection from the union. The court ruled that general allegations of discrimination were sufficient to fulfill the Rule 8 requirement of a "short and plain statement" because liberal discovery guidelines allowed the complaint to gain much more specificity before trial. The kind of pleading allowed by Conley was known as "notice pleading."

Conley presumes that the plaintiff's allegations are true, the facts are construed as most favorable to the plaintiff, and the case cannot be dismissed unless it is proven that the plaintiff can prove no set of facts.

== Subsequent developments ==
In 2007, the United States Supreme Court overruled Conley, creating a new, stricter standard of a pleading's required specificity. Under the standard the Court set forth in Conley, a complaint need only state facts which make it "conceivable" that it could prove its legal claims—that is, that a court could only dismiss a claim if it appeared, beyond a doubt, that the plaintiff would be able to prove "no set of facts" in support of her claim that would entitle her to relief. In Bell Atlantic Corp. v. Twombly, the court adopted a more strict, "plausibility" standard, requiring in this case "enough fact[s] to raise a reasonable expectation that discovery will reveal evidence of illegal agreement." The Twombly reading was upheld in Ashcroft v. Iqbal in 2009.

== See also ==
- List of United States Supreme Court cases, volume 355
