= Demurrer =

Legal document

A demurrer is a pleading in a lawsuit that objects to or challenges a pleading filed by an opposing party. The word demur means "to object"; a demurrer is the document that makes the objection. Lawyers informally define a demurrer as a defendant saying "So what?" to the pleading.

Typically, the defendant in a case will demur to the complaint, but it is also possible for the plaintiff to demur to an answer. The demurrer challenges the legal sufficiency of a cause of action in a complaint or of an affirmative defense in an answer. If a cause of action in a complaint does not state a cognizable claim or if it does not state all the required elements, then the challenged cause of action or possibly the entire complaint can be dismissed at the demurrer stage as not legally sufficient. A demurrer is typically filed near the beginning of a case in response to the plaintiff filing a complaint or the defendant answering the complaint.

In common law, a demurrer was the pleading through which a defendant challenged the legal sufficiency of a complaint in criminal or civil cases. Today, however, the pleading has been discontinued in many jurisdictions, including the United Kingdom, the U.S. federal court system, and most U.S. states (though some states, including California, Pennsylvania, and Virginia, retain it). In criminal cases, a demurrer was considered a common law due process right, to be heard and decided before the defendant was required to plead "not guilty," or make any other pleading in response, without having to admit or deny any of the facts alleged.

A demurrer generally assumes the truth of all material facts alleged in the complaint, and the defendant cannot present evidence to the contrary, even if those facts appear to be obvious fabrications by the plaintiff or are likely to be easily disproved during litigation. That is, the point of the demurrer is to test whether a cause of action or affirmative defense as pleaded is legally insufficient, even if all facts pleaded are assumed to be true.

The sole exception to the no-evidence rule is that a court may take judicial notice of certain things. For example, the court can take judicial notice of commonly known facts not reasonably subject to challenge, such as the Gregorian calendar, or of public records, such as a published legislative report showing the intent of the legislature in enacting a particular statute.

== Overview ==
=== Civil cases ===
A demurrer is commonly filed by a defendant in response to a complaint filed by the plaintiff. A demurrer to a complaint can terminate a lawsuit. Although a plaintiff may demur to a defendant's answer to a complaint or the defendant's affirmative defenses, a demurrer to an answer is less common because it may be a poor strategic move.

A demurrer to an answer may simplify a lawsuit, but it usually will not end the lawsuit. It is normally used only when the plaintiff intends to move for summary judgment in their favor at the earliest opportunity and needs to preemptively attack some of the defendant's affirmative defenses.

There is one rare scenario in which a demurrer to a defendant's answer may be immediately dispositive of an entire action: if the demurring plaintiff is able to establish through a request for judicial notice of the record of a prior action between the same parties that the issues raised in the answer were fully and fairly resolved against the answering defendant in that prior action and are therefore subject to the res judicata effect of a prior judgment in that action.

Technically, a demurrer is not a motion; a party does not file a motion for demurrer nor move the court to demur. Rather, a demurrer is a particular type of pleading and demurring is the act by which a party formally requests the court to dismiss a cause of action (claim) or the entire complaint.

In lay terms, a judge who sustains a demurrer is saying that the law does not recognize a legal claim for the facts stated by the complaining party. If the judge overrules a demurrer, the court is allowing the claim or case to proceed.

In legal terms, the demurring party asserts that the complaint or counterclaim does not amount to a legally valid claim, even if the factual allegations contained in the complaint or counterclaim are accepted as true.

Usually, a demurrer attacks a complaint as missing one or more required elements of a claim. Those elements are usually attacked by showing that the plaintiff failed to plead an essential element per se or facts that adequately support it (e.g., facts giving rise to an actionable duty running from the defendant to the plaintiff). Another method is to attack the entire cause of action itself as abolished or prohibited as against public policy (e.g., wrongful life is against public policy in most jurisdictions).

Demurrers are decided by a judge rather than a jury. The judge either grants the demurrer by sustaining it, or denies it by overruling the demurrer. If the demurrer is overruled, the defendant is ordered to file an answer within a certain period of time or else risk a default judgment. Once the answer is filed, then the case is said to be "at issue" (because there are now a complaint and answer on file opposing each other with the parties' respective provisions), and the case proceeds to the discovery stage.

In the alternative, a judge may sustain a demurrer with prejudice or without prejudice. With prejudice means the plaintiff cannot file another complaint attempting to fix insufficiencies of the previous complaint. If the demurrer is granted without prejudice and/or with leave to amend, then the plaintiff may correct errors filing a corrected and/or amended complaint. Demurrers sustained with prejudice are reserved for when the judge determines a plaintiff cannot cure or fix the complaint by rewriting or amending it. Depending upon the severity of the defect in a complaint, a court may sustain with prejudice on the first demurrer (very rare) or allow the plaintiff as many as three or four attempts before sustaining a demurrer to a third or fourth amended complaint with prejudice.

=== Criminal cases ===
In criminal cases, a demurrer may be used in some circumstances to challenge the legal sufficiency of the indictment or other similar charging instrument. Traditionally, if the defendant could admit every allegation of the indictment and still be innocent of any crime, then a general demurrer would be sustained and the indictment would be dismissed. A special demurrer refers to an attack on the form, rather than the substance, of the charge: if the defendant correctly identifies some defect "on the face" of the indictment, then the charges are subject to being dismissed, although usually the indictment can be redrawn (rewritten) and re-presented to the grand jury or other charging authority. While there are different ways to accomplish the goals of a special demurrer, often an alternative method to challenge the sufficiency of the indictment is an attack on the prosecution's case prior to trial, and is generally made by means of motion to dismiss.

== England and Wales ==
In civil law a demurrer as such is no longer available under the current law of England and Wales. However, two similar procedures may be employed where claims without merit need to be expeditiously dismissed .

First, an application on notice can be made for summary judgment in favor of the objecting party. Second, the court has power to strike out the Particulars of Claim.

To have a non-meritorious claim dismissed, however, the distinction between the two procedures is that when the Particulars of Claim are struck out, the claimant usually has another opportunity to file an amended Particulars of Claim, within, for example, four weeks, whereas Summary Judgment is final, though subject to appeal.

In criminal law demurrer is obsolete, although not formally abolished. It has been superseded by the more modern motion to quash, usually a verbal application to the judge to rule the indictment null and void and to stop the case. (Demurrer was pleaded in writing).

== United States ==
=== Federal courts ===
In civil cases in the United States district courts, the demurrer was expressly abolished by Rule 7(c) of the Federal Rules of Civil Procedure ("FRCP", also "Federal Rules") when the FRCP went into effect on September 16, 1938. The demurrer was replaced by the Rule 12(b)(6) motion to dismiss for failure to state a claim upon which relief can be granted.

The demurrer was abolished after American lawyers realized that the pleadings should frame only those issues that will be actively litigated through motion practice once both sides have fully stated their positions and the case is at issue. Although the demurrer technically also framed the issues in a case, treating the demurrer as a pleading came to be seen as irrational because it was the only pleading that required an immediate hearing and ruling on its content (which consisted of an attack upon the complaint), while the complaint and the answer merely stated the respective positions of each side but did not require hearings in and of themselves. Thus, it made sense that a discretionary attack upon the complaint that was already being drafted, calendared, heard, and ruled upon like a motion should simply be treated like one.

Having purged the demurrer from federal courts, Rule 7(c) was deemed obsolete by the Advisory Committee on Civil Rules during the 2002–2007 FRCP revision cycle. It was therefore deleted from the version of the FRCP that went into effect on December 1, 2007.

=== State courts ===
A majority of U.S. states (approximately 35) have adopted civil procedure rules modeled after the Federal Rules and therefore have abolished the demurrer and replaced it with the motion to dismiss for failure to state a claim upon which relief can be granted. In Ohio, for example, demurrers are specifically prohibited.

However, a demurrer can still be filed by the defendant in a minority of U.S. state court systems. Demurrers are still used in California and Virginia state court civil practice. In California, a demurrer must assume the truth of the facts alleged by the complaining party, but challenges the complaint as a matter of law. If a demurrer is sustained regarding the form of the complaint, leave to amend is liberally granted, and denial of leave to amend may constitute an abuse of discretion. Additionally, when children are removed from their parents and taken into foster care in California, the parents may challenge the sufficiency of the dependency complaint by means of a motion akin to demurrer, which operates similarly to a demurrer. However, demurrers are prohibited in California in other family law actions. Also in California, a demurrer is not said to be "granted," but is said to be "sustained" or "overruled." An order sustaining a demurrer is not a readily appealable order unless it disposes of an entire action without leave to amend and results in a judgment.

The term preliminary objection is used in Pennsylvania state court to refer to all motions made after the filing of a complaint but before the filing of an answer; preliminary objections may be made "in the nature of a demurrer" (seeking to dismiss a cause of action for legal insufficiency) or "in the nature of a motion to strike" (seeking to remove parts of a pleading for failure to abide by the technical rules), as well as various other means. As with the traditional demurrer, preliminary objections are regarded as pleadings. Preliminary objections in the nature of a demurrer are governed by Rule 1028(a)(4) of the Pennsylvania Rules of Civil Procedure.
