= Pleading =

In law, statement of a party's claims to another party's claims in a civil action

In law as practiced in countries that follow the English models, a pleading is a formal written statement of one party's claims or defenses in response to another party's complaint(s) in a civil action. The parties' pleadings in a case define the issues to be adjudicated in the action. The Civil Procedure Rules (CPR) govern pleading in England and Wales. Federal Rules of Civil Procedure govern pleading in United States federal courts. Each state in the United States has its own statutes and rules that govern pleading in the courts of that state.

== Examples ==
Under the Federal Rules of Civil Procedure a complaint is the first pleading in American law filed by a plaintiff which initiates a lawsuit. A complaint sets forth the relevant allegations of fact that give rise to one or more legal causes of action along with a prayer for relief and sometimes a statement of damages claimed (an ad quod damnum clause). In some situations, a complaint is called a petition, in which case the party filing it is called the petitioner and the other party is the respondent. In equity, sometimes called chancery, the initial pleading may be called either a petition or a bill of complaint in chancery.

In England and Wales, the first pleading is a Claim Form, issued under either Part 7 or Part 8 of the Civil Procedure Rules, which sets out the nature of the action and the relief sought, and may give brief particulars of the claim. The Claimant also has the option, under Practice Direction 7A.61 to serve Particulars of Claim (a document setting out the allegations which found the cause of action) within 14 days of the issue of the Claim Form. When used in civil proceedings in England and Wales, the term "complaint" refers to the mechanism by which civil proceedings are instituted in the magistrates' court and may be either written or oral.

A demurrer is a pleading (usually filed by a defendant) which objects to the legal sufficiency of the opponent's pleading (usually a complaint) and demands that the court rule immediately about whether the pleading is legally adequate before the party must plead on the merits in response. Since the demurrer procedure required an immediate ruling as does a motion, many common law jurisdictions therefore narrowed the concept of pleadings to be framing the issues in a case. Pleadings are not motions in and of themselves, and courts replaced the demurrer mechanism with the motion to dismiss for failure to state a cause of action or the application to strike out particulars of claim.

An answer is a pleading filed by a defendant which admits or denies the specific allegations set forth in a complaint and constitutes a general appearance by a defendant. In England and Wales, the equivalent pleading is called a Defence. A defendant may also file a cross-complaint against another defendant named by the plaintiff and may also file a third-party complaint to bring other parties into a case by the process of impleader. A defendant may file a counter-claim to raise a cause of action to defend, reduce or set off the claim of the plaintiff.

== Systems ==
=== Common law ===
Common law pleading was the system of civil procedure used in England, which early on developed a strong emphasis on the form of action rather than the cause of action (as a result of the Provisions of Oxford, which severely limited the evolution of the common law writ system). The emphasis was on procedure over substance. Law and equity evolved as separate judicial systems, each with its own procedures and remedies. Because the types of claims eligible for consideration was capped early during the development of the English legal system, claims that might have been acceptable to the courts' evolving sense of justice often did not match up perfectly with any of the established forms of action. Lawyers had to engage in great ingenuity to shoehorn their clients' claims into existing forms of action. The result was that at common law, pleadings were stuffed full of awkward legal fictions that had little to do with the actual "real-world" facts of the case. The placeholder name John Doe (still commonly used in American pleading to name unknown parties) is a remnant of this period.

In its final form in the 19th century, common law pleading was terribly complex and slow by modern standards. The parties would normally go through several rounds of pleadings before the parties were deemed to have clearly stated their controversy, so that the case was "at issue" and could proceed to trial. A case would begin with a complaint in which the plaintiff alleged the facts entitling him to relief, then the defendant would file any one of a variety of pleas as an answer, followed by a replication from the plaintiff, a rejoinder from the defendant, a surrejoinder from the plaintiff, a rebutter from the defendant, and a surrebutter from the plaintiff. At each stage, a party could file a demurrer to the other's pleading (essentially a request that the court immediately rule on whether the pleading was legally adequate before they had to file a pleading in response) or simply file another pleading in response.

Generally, a plea could be dilatory or peremptory. There were three kinds of dilatory plea: to the jurisdiction, in suspension, or in abatement. The first challenged the court's jurisdiction, the second asked the court to stay the action, and the third asked the court to dismiss the action without prejudice to the other side's right to bring the claims in another action or another court. A peremptory plea had only one kind: a plea in bar. A party making a plea in bar could either traverse the other side's pleading (i.e., deny all or some of the facts pleaded) or confess and avoid it (i.e., admit the facts pleaded but plead new ones that would dispel their effect). A traverse could be general (deny everything) or specific. Either side could plead imparlance in order to get more time to plead on the merits. Once the case was at issue, the defendant could reopen the pleadings in order to plead a newly discovered defense (and start the whole sequence again) by filing a plea puis darrein. The result of all this complexity was that to ascertain what was "at issue" in a case, a stranger to the case (i.e., such as a newly appointed judge) would have to sift through a huge pile of pleadings to figure out what had happened to the original averments of the complaint and whether there was anything left to be actually adjudicated by the court.

=== Code ===
Code pleading was first introduced in 1850 in New York and in 1851 in California, and eventually spread to 26 other states. Code pleading sought to abolish the distinction between law and equity. It unified civil procedure for all types of actions as much as possible. The focus shifted from pleading the right form of action (that is, the right procedure) to pleading the right cause of action (that is, a substantive right to be enforced by the law).

Code pleading stripped out most of the legal fictions that had encrusted common law pleading by requiring parties to plead "ultimate facts." This means that to plead a cause of action, the pleader has to plead each element and also allege specific facts which, if proven with evidence at trial, would constitute proof of that element. Failure to provide such detail could lead to dismissal of the case if the defendant successfully demurred to the complaint on the basis that it merely stated "legal conclusions" or "evidentiary facts."

Code pleading also drastically shortened the pleading process. Most of the old common law pleadings were abolished. From now on, a case required only a complaint and an answer, with an optional cross-complaint and cross-answer, and with the demurrer kept as the standard attack on improper pleadings. Instead of piling layers and layers of pleadings and averments on top of each other, a pleading that was attacked by demurrer would either be completely superseded by an amended pleading or would proceed immediately "at issue" as to the validly pleaded parts. This meant that to determine what the parties were currently fighting about, a stranger to a case would no longer have to read the entire case file from scratch, but could (in theory) look only at the most recent version of the complaint filed by the plaintiff, the defendant's most recent answer to that complaint, and any court orders on demurrers to either pleading.

Code pleading was criticized because many lawyers felt that it was too difficult to fully research all the facts needed to bring a complaint before one had even initiated the action, and thus meritorious plaintiffs could not bring their complaints in time before the statute of limitations expired. Code pleading has also been criticized as promoting "hypertechnical reading of legal papers".

=== Notice ===
Notice pleading is the dominant form of pleading used in the United States today. In 1938, the Federal Rules of Civil Procedure were adopted to govern civil procedure in United States federal courts. One goal of the Federal Rules of Civil Procedure was to relax the strict rules of code pleading. However, each state also has its own rules of civil procedure, which may require different, looser, or stricter rules in state court.

=== Fact ===
Louisiana, a state that derives its legal tradition from the Spanish and French civil law (as opposed to English common law), employs a system of fact pleading wherein it is only necessary to plead the facts that give rise to a cause of action. It is not necessary even for the petitioner to identify the cause of action being pleaded. However, mere conclusory allegations such as "the defendant was negligent" are not, by themselves, sufficient to sustain a cause of action. Other states, including Connecticut and New Jersey, are also fact-pleading jurisdictions. Illinois, for example, requires that a complaint "must assert a legally recognized cause of action and it must plead facts which bring the particular case within that cause of action."

=== Alternative ===
In alternative pleading, legal fiction is employed to permit a party to argue two mutually exclusive possibilities, for example, submitting an injury complaint alleging that the harm to the plaintiff caused by the defendant was so outrageous that it must have either been intended as a malicious attack or, if not, must have been due to gross negligence.

== Linguistic ==
=== "Pleaded" vs. "pled" ===
The use of "pleaded" versus "pled" as the past tense version of "pleading" has been a subject of controversy among many of those that practice law. "Pled" is almost never used in Australian publications, while being somewhat common in American, British, and Canadian publications. In a 2010 search of the Westlaw legal database, "pled" is used in a narrow majority of cases over "pleaded". The AP stylebook and The Chicago Manual of Style call for "pleaded", and a Westlaw search shows the US Supreme Court has used pleaded in over 3,000 opinions and pled in only 26.

== See also ==
- Bill of particulars
- General denial
- Legal syllogism
- More definite statement
- Motion (legal)
- Motion for leave
- Negative pregnant
- Petition
- Plea
- Prima facie
