= General denial =

In pleading, a general denial is a denial that relates to all allegations which are not otherwise pleaded to. Many legal systems provide that in a statement of defense, any allegation made by the plaintiff which is not traversed (i.e. specifically denied or "not-admitted") is deemed to have been admitted by the defendants. Accordingly, it became common practice to add a general denial at the end of a statement of defense to make sure that nothing was accidentally admitted in this fashion.

In English law, the usual form of general denial was normally phrased:

"Except as hereinbefore expressly admitted or not-admitted, each and every paragraph of the statement of claim is denied as if set out herein seriatim."
