= Bell Atlantic Corp. v. Twombly =

Bell Atlantic v. Twombly
- Supreme Court of the United States

Argued November 27, 2006 Decided May 21, 2007
- Full case name: Bell Atlantic Corporation, BellSouth Corporation, Qwest Communications International Inc., SBC Communications Inc., and Verizon Communications Inc. (successor-in-interest to Bell Atlantic Corporation) v. William Twombly and Lawrence Marcus, both individually and on behalf of all others similarly situated
- Docket no.: 05-1126
- Citations: 550 U.S. 544 (more) 127 S. Ct. 1955, 167 L. Ed. 2d 929, 75 U.S.L.W. 4337, 2007-1 Trade Cases ¶ 75,709, 68 Fed.R.Serv.3d 661, 07 Cal. Daily Op. Serv. 5550, 2007 Daily Journal D.A.R. 7097, 41 Communications Reg. (P&F) 567, 20 Fla. L. Weekly Fed. S 267
- Argument: Oral argument

Case history
- Prior: Complaint dismissed, 313 F. Supp. 2d 174 (S.D.N.Y. 2003), vacated and remanded, 425 F.3d 99 (2d Cir. 2005), cert. granted, 548 U.S. 903 (2006).

Holding
- Parallel conduct alone, absent some evidence of agreement to engage in anti-competitive behavior, is not sufficient to prove a violation of Section 1 of the Sherman Act. A complaint must allege facts with sufficient specificity to state a claim for relief that is plausible, not merely conceivable, on its face.

Court membership
- Chief Justice John Roberts Associate Justices John P. Stevens · Antonin Scalia; Anthony Kennedy · David Souter; Clarence Thomas · Ruth Bader Ginsburg; Stephen Breyer · Samuel Alito

Case opinions
- Majority: Souter, joined by Roberts, Scalia, Kennedy, Thomas, Breyer, Alito
- Dissent: Stevens, joined by Ginsburg (except Part IV)

Laws applied
- Sherman Act, 15 U.S.C. Section 1; Federal Rule of Civil Procedure 8(a)(2), 12(b)(6)
- This case overturned a previous ruling or rulings
- Conley v. Gibson (1957)

Bell Atlantic Corp. v. Twombly, 550 U.S. 544 (2007), was a decision of the Supreme Court of the United States involving antitrust law and civil procedure. The court's opinion, authored by Justice David Souter, established that parallel conduct, absent evidence of agreement, is insufficient to sustain an antitrust action under Section 1 of the Sherman Act. It also heightened the pleading requirement for federal civil cases by requiring plaintiffs to include enough facts in their complaint to make it plausible, not merely possible or conceivable, that they will be able to prove facts to support their claims. The latter change in the law has been met with a great deal of controversy in legal circles, as evidenced by the dissenting opinion from Justice John Paul Stevens.

== Background ==
William Twombly and Lawrence Marcus brought a class-action lawsuit alleging that Bell Atlantic and the Baby Bells (successor companies to the trust-busted AT&T) had engaged in anti-competitive behavior in violation of Section 1 of the Sherman Antitrust Act. Specifically, the plaintiffs alleged that the companies had acted to disadvantage smaller telephone companies and charge consumers more by, for example, refraining from entering markets where another large company was dominant (thereby preventing a price war), even though the Telecommunications Act of 1996 had made it relatively inexpensive to do so. The lawsuit alleged a conspiracy between the Baby Bells to not compete. As examples, the lawsuit noted that Qwest did not compete in California despite having business in all the surrounding states, and that Verizon did no business in Connecticut despite having a monopoly in all the surrounding states.

Their complaint was dismissed by Judge Gerard E. Lynch of the U.S. District Court for the Southern District of New York, as failing to allege sufficient facts to state a claim for a violation of the Sherman Act. The decision was reversed by the Second Circuit Court of Appeals, and the Supreme Court agreed to hear the case in 2006.

== Decision ==
The Supreme Court reversed the decision of the Second Circuit, which had reversed the decision of the district court dismissing the complaint for failure to state a claim under Rule 12(b)(6) of the Federal Rules of Civil Procedure.

As an initial matter, the Supreme Court clarified the requirements of proving a claim of anti-competitive behavior under Section 1 of the Sherman Act. The Sherman Act prohibits entering into a "contract, combination, or conspiracy" to restrain trade. The court held that while parallel conduct (actions by competing companies that might be seen as implying some agreement to work together) is "admissible circumstantial evidence" from which an agreement to engage in anti-competitive behavior may be inferred, parallel conduct alone is insufficient to prove a Sherman Act claim.

The court then upheld the district court's dismissal of the plaintiff's complaint, holding that the mere allegations contained in the complaint that the competitors had agreed not to compete were insufficient to state a claim of conspiracy under the Sherman Act. The court found that Twombly's complaint had not provided enough facts to find it plausible that the companies had engaged in a conspiracy; instead, the complaint provided only a factual basis for parallel conduct, which was not enough under the court's new interpretation of the Sherman Act, and alleged only that an agreement had been made, with no details to support that allegation. The court held that the dismissal of the complaint was therefore proper.

The decision changed the existing interpretation of the notice pleading requirements of Federal Rule of Civil Procedure 8(a)(2) and the standards for dismissal under Federal Rule of Civil Procedure 12(b)(6) by creating a new, stricter standard of a pleading's required specificity.

Previously, under the standard the court set forth in Conley v. Gibson, a complaint needed to state only a "conceivable" set of facts to support its legal claims. In other words, a court could not dismiss claims unless it appeared, beyond a reasonable doubt, that plaintiffs would be able to prove no set of facts in support of their claims that would entitle them to relief. In Twombly, the court adopted a stricter "plausibility" standard that required "enough fact[s] to raise a reasonable expectation that discovery will reveal evidence of illegal agreement."

The Twombly test, however, remained vague, and the legal establishment was stumped as how to interpret the "plausibility" standard, even though it was not supposed to be a heightened pleading standard, as the Court said in footnote 14. The general applicability of the test outside of antitrust cases was established in Ashcroft v. Iqbal, when the court provided guidance as to how lower courts should apply the test:

Two working principles underlie our decision in Twombly. First, the tenet that a court must accept as true all of the allegations contained in a complaint is inapplicable to legal conclusions... Second, only a complaint that states a plausible claim for relief survives a motion to dismiss. Determining whether a complaint states a plausible claim for relief will, as the Court of Appeals observed, be a context-specific task that requires the reviewing court to draw on its judicial experience and common sense. In keeping with these principles a court considering a motion to dismiss can choose to begin by identifying pleadings that, because they are no more than conclusions, are not entitled to the assumption of truth. While legal conclusions can provide the framework of a complaint, they must be supported by factual allegations. When there are well-pleaded factual allegations, a court should assume their veracity and then determine whether they plausibly give rise to an entitlement to relief. Our decision in Twombly illustrates the two-pronged approach.

The two cases are often jointly referred to as Twiqbal.

The case was argued by Michael K. Kellogg of law firm Kellogg, Huber, Hansen, Todd, Evans & Figel and Thomas O. Barnett, Assistant Attorney General of the United States Department of Justice Antitrust Division, on behalf of the United States as amicus curiae for the petitioners.

Twombly remains controversial as of 2020. Not only did it overturn Conley v. Gibson, but it also overturned Leatherman v. Tarrant County Narcotics Intelligence and Coordination Unit, 507 U.S. 163 (1992). Leatherman had unanimously established that the heightened pleading standard was fundamentally at odds with the Federal Rules of Civil Procedure, and the court opined that the only way to change the standard would be to amend the Rules. The Court had further cemented this idea with another unanimous ruling in Swierkiewicz v. Sorema, N.A., 534 U.S. 506 (2002), making Twombly all the more surprising.

== Legislative reaction ==
On July 22, 2009, after the Supreme Court broadened Twombly with its decision in Iqbal, Senator Arlen Specter introduced the Notice Pleading Restoration Act of 2009, which provided:

Except as otherwise expressly provided by an Act of Congress or by an amendment to the Federal Rules of Civil Procedure which takes effect after the date of enactment of this Act, a Federal court shall not dismiss a complaint under rule 12(b)(6) or (e) of the Federal Rules of Civil Procedure, except under the standards set forth by the Supreme Court of the United States in Conley v. Gibson, 355 U.S. 41 (1957).4

Shortly thereafter, a similar bill was introduced in the US House of Representatives. It was called the Open Access to Courts Act of 2009:

A court shall not dismiss a complaint under subdivision (b)(6), (c) or (e) of Rule 12 of the Federal Rules of Civil Procedure unless it appears beyond doubt that the plaintiff can prove no set of facts in support of the claim which would entitle the plaintiff to relief. A court shall not dismiss a complaint under one of those subdivisions on the basis of a determination by the judge that the factual contents of the complaint do not show the plaintiff's claim to be plausible or are insufficient to warrant a reasonable inference that the defendant is liable for the misconduct alleged.

Neither bill ever made it to the floor for a vote.

== See also ==
- List of United States Supreme Court cases, volume 550
- List of United States Supreme Court cases
- Ashcroft v. Iqbal
