= Motion for more definite statement =

A motion for more definite statement in many jurisdictions in the United States, and under United States federal law, is a means of obtaining a more detailed motion from the opposing party in a civil case before interposing a responsive pleading.

== Federal civil procedure ==
In United States federal court jurisprudence, the motion is permitted by Rule 12(e) of The Federal Rules of Civil Procedure.

The reason for this motion is that the "responsive pleading is allowed but which is so vague or ambiguous that the party cannot reasonably prepare a response." The timing of the motion is determinative: "The motion must be made before filing a responsive pleading and must point out the defects complained of and the details desired."

The judge assigned to the case (usually a United States District Court judge or Magistrate Judge) will respond either by granting the motion or striking it from the record if it is found to be without legal merit. The motion must contain a point-by-point rebuttal, with each point numbered, and ideally should reference some case law in support of the motion. The consequences of this motion are dire and significant: "If the court orders a more definite statement and the order is not obeyed within 14 days after notice of the order or within the time the court sets, the court may strike the pleading or issue any other appropriate order." If the pleading is the only one filed, then the lawsuit can be dismissed. If the statute of limitations has expired, then it prevents the lawsuit from being brought against, thus ending any chance to sue ever again.

== State civil procedure ==
In New York State, a Demand for a Bill of Particulars has been a common practice.

In the Commonwealth of Virginia, a motion seeking such relief is called a motion for a bill of particulars.
