= Leave (legal) =

A motion or application for leave is a motion filed with the court seeking permission to deviate from an established rule or procedure of the court.

The most common use of a motion for leave is to seek an extension to an already-passed time frame to amend a court pleading, which is allowed once under the Federal Rules of Criminal Procedure, to make changes of error made in title or body.
