= Pleading (England and Wales) =

Pleading in England and Wales is covered by the Civil Procedure Rules (CPR). These rules set a high priority on attempts to resolve all matters able to be resolved by the parties, prior to hearing (or trial).

The pleadings are contained in various Statements of Case - usually the Claim and any associated Particulars of Claim, the Defence, and an optional reply to the Defence. The Claim, Particulars of Claim, and Defence, are broadly equivalent to the Summons, Complaint and Answer filed in some other jurisdictions). The pleadings set out succinctly the claims made by each side, and their legal basis, and provide a basis to explore the issues in the case. They must specify the basic facts which are alleged, but need not evidence those facts or any extensive legal argument (these are addressed at later stages of the process). Some types of allegation must be expressly stated in the appropriate statement of case, if they will be alleged or relied upon at a later stage.

== Civil Procedure Rules ==
The Civil Procedure Rules ("CPR") and their accompanying Practice Directions provide, within the framework of legislation, the detailed rules about how courts and cases are conducted.

== Mediation and other resolution efforts ==
Formal proceedings should be preceded by an initial exchange of correspondence in accordance with the Practice Direction on Pre-Action Protocols. Mediation and legally binding offers to resolve are also strongly encouraged and the applicable rules are set out within the CPR.

Such exchanges are not technically part of the pleading process, and parties are not encouraged to take points on any discrepancy between pre-action correspondence and the formal statements of case. Their function is to facilitate out-of-court approaches to resolving the dispute, or identifying the issues that divide the parties. The courts consider the genuineness of attempts to resolve the case by dialogue, when considering how costs will be bourne by the parties.

== Pleading in court ==
There are three initial documents upon which a case is founded: a Claim and (in most cases) the Particulars of Claim, and the Defence. These are broadly equivalent to the Summons, Complaint and Answer filed in some other jurisdictions. They set out the case to be presented by each party, briefly but in sufficient detail to understand the legal issues in dispute and claims made by each party as a result.

=== Value of claim ===
The stated "value" on the Claim form excludes any costs and interest. It is generally worded to match one of the standard sums addressed in different kinds of court ("Not more than £X" or "Not less than £X and not more than £Y", or "Cannot be said").

This statement of value is more administrative in purpose: it is generally used by the Court and other parties to gain an idea of the size of the case and how it should be administered (its "track"). The amount stated does not limit any award that the Court may decide to grant, or any other remedies that may be given, when the case is heard.

=== Matters to be stated or included ===
The Rules and their Practice Directions (principally CPR 16 and its related Practice Direction 16) also set out various items which must be included in or served with statements of case in particular circumstances. Examples include: -

- The remedies sought and the value of any monetary claim;
- Government officers or departments claimed against, if relevant;
- Representative capacities of various parties, if relevant;
- medical reports or other reports and requirements in specific kinds of cases, if applicable (Practice Direction 16 paragraphs 4.3 and 12.1)
- Any written contract, for a contractual case (Practice Direction 16 paragraph 7.3)
- Any claim that will be alleged of an illegal act, dishonesty, or breach of trust, but also any claims related to mitigation of harm, or assertions concerning knowledge of facts.

=== Statements of case ===
Statements of case may refer to points of law and include names of witnesses whom it is proposed to call. A party may also attach to or serve with a statement of case any document which is considered necessary to the claim or defence, but which is not required to be attached or served. The claim form and all statements of case must be verified by a statement of truth, signed by the party or his or her legal representative. A person who makes a false statement in a document verified by a statement of truth without an honest belief in its truth is liable to be prosecuted for contempt of court.

== Claim and Particulars of Claim ==
Part 16 of the Civil Procedure Rules and its accompanying Practice Direction (CPR PD 16) govern the content of the claim form (equivalent to a Summons) and statements of case.

The claim form must contain a concise statement of the nature of the claim and specify the remedies which the claimant seeks. It must also contain a statement of value in accordance with CPR 16.3.

The Particulars of Claim (equivalent to a Complaint) must contain a concise statement of case (which includes the legal and factual case) on which the claimant relies, together with details of any interest claimed and whether aggravated damages or provisional damages are claimed. In very straightforward cases, all details on the Particulars of claim can be included on the claim form, in which case separate particulars are not required.

== Defence ==
The Defence (equivalent to an Answer) must state which allegations of the Particulars of Claim are admitted, which allegations are denied, and which allegations the defendant is unable to admit or deny, but which the claimant is required to prove. A defendant must give reasons for any denial, and must put forward his or her own version of events if different from the claimant's version. The Rules do not speak to affirmative defences (save that CPR PD 16 paragraph 13.1 requires the defendant to give details of the expiry of any limitation period relied on), but a concise statement of any facts relied on in support of any affirmative defence should be included in the Defence.

The claimant may, but need not, respond to the Defence by means of a Reply. Further statements of case following a Reply are possible, but require the court's permission.

== Counterclaim ==
Counterclaims, claims for contribution or indemnity against another party, and third party claims (collectively referred to as 'additional claims') are governed by CPR Part 20.

A counterclaim should normally be included in the same document ('Defence and Counterclaim') as the defence and should follow on from it. The claimant's defence to the counterclaim should be included in the same document ('Reply and Defence to Counterclaim') as the reply and should follow on from the reply. A claim for contribution or indemnity against another party is made by serving and filing a notice containing a statement of the nature and grounds of the claim.

== Third-party claim ==
A third-party claim is made by issuing and serving a third-party claim form (equivalent to a Summons), together with particulars of the third party claim.

An additional claim is treated as a normal claim unless Part 20 otherwise provides, so the rules on contents of claim forms, Particulars of Claim, Defences and Replies apply accordingly, although the title of the statement of case should be modified to make clear who is pleading, and which statement of case, if any, is being responded to.

== Amendment of statements of case ==
Amendment of statements of case is governed by CPR Part 17, and requests for information about statements of case are governed by CPR Part 18.
