= Twiqbal =

Term in American civil procedure

Twiqbal is a colloquial term in American law (civil procedure), referring to two separate US Supreme Court cases that heightened the pleading standard under the Federal Rules of Civil Procedure. Together, these cases made it more difficult to sue in federal court by requiring that plaintiffs demonstrate that their claims are "plausible", rather than simply describing the case in sufficient detail to put the defendant on notice.

The two cases are Bell Atlantic Corp. v. Twombly, 550 U.S. 544 (2007) and Ashcroft v. Iqbal, 556 U.S. 662 (2009), and "Twiqbal" is a portmanteau of Twombly and Iqbal. Because the two cases together have wrought a significant change in American civil procedure, the cases together, and the principle for which the cases stand, have both become commonly referred to as Twiqbal.

== Iqbal expansion of Twombly ==
The Supreme Court's 2009 Iqbal case elaborated the heightened standard of pleading it established two years previously in Twombly, and established that it was generally applicable in all federal civil litigation and not limited to antitrust law:

Two working principles underlie our decision in Twombly. First, the tenet that a court must accept as true all of the allegations contained in a complaint is inapplicable to legal conclusions. ... Second, only a complaint that states a plausible claim for relief survives a motion to dismiss. Determining whether a complaint states a plausible claim for relief will, as the Court of Appeals observed, be a context-specific task that requires the reviewing court to draw on its judicial experience and common sense. In keeping with these principles a court considering a motion to dismiss can choose to begin by identifying pleadings that, because they are no more than conclusions, are not entitled to the assumption of truth. While legal conclusions can provide the framework of a complaint, they must be supported by factual allegations. When there are well-pleaded factual allegations, a court should assume their veracity and then determine whether they plausibly give rise to an entitlement to relief. Our decision in Twombly illustrates the two-pronged approach.

== Effects of Twiqbal ==
The effect of these two decisions has been described as "incredibly consequential" and "controversial". After Iqbal was decided, expanding Twombly's reach beyond antitrust law, legislation was introduced, but not passed, to reverse the cases and re-introduce "notice pleading."

== See also ==
- Federal Rules of Civil Procedure (FRCP)
- Pleading (United States)

== Bibliography ==
- Engstrom, David Freeman (2013). "The Twiqbal Puzzle and Empirical Study of Civil Procedure". Stanford Law Review. 65: 1203 et seq. JSTOR 23528250.
- Frankel, Alison (January 9, 2013). "Supreme Court Declines to Halt 2nd Circuit's Twiqbal Pushback". Reuters. Archived from the original on 14 Jan 2013.
- Janssen, William M (2013). "The Odd State of Twiqbal Plausibility in Pleading Affirmative Defenses". Washington and Lee Law Review. 70 (3): 1573 et seq.
- Spencer, A Benjamin (2013). "Pleading and Access to Civil Justice: A Response to Twiqbal Apologists" (PDF). UCLA Law Review. 60: 1710 et seq.
