= Answer (law) =

Legal document, filed in response to a complaint

In law, an answer was originally a solemn assertion in opposition to someone or something, and thus generally any counter-statement or defense, a reply to a question or response, or objection, or a correct solution of a problem.

In the common law, an answer is the first pleading by a defendant, usually filed and served upon the plaintiff within a certain strict time limit after a civil complaint or criminal information or indictment has been served upon the defendant. It may have been preceded by an optional "pre-answer" motion to dismiss or demurrer; if such a motion is unsuccessful, the defendant must file an answer to the complaint or risk an adverse default judgment.

In a criminal case, there is usually an arraignment or some other kind of appearance before the defendant comes to court. The pleading in the criminal case, which is entered on the record in open court, is usually either guilty or not guilty. Generally, speaking in private, civil cases there is no plea entered of guilt or innocence. There is only a judgment that grants money damages or some other kind of equitable remedy such as restitution or a permanent injunction. Criminal cases may lead to fines or other punishment, such as imprisonment.

The famous Latin Responsa Prudentium ("answers of the learned ones") were the accumulated views of many successive generations of Roman lawyers, a body of legal opinion which gradually became authoritative.

During debates of a contentious nature, deflection, colloquially known as 'changing the topic', has been widely observed, and is often seen as a failure to answer a question.
