= Ashcroft v. Iqbal =

- Supreme Court of the United States

Argued December 10, 2008 Decided May 18, 2009
- Full case name: John D. Ashcroft, former Attorney General, et al., Petitioners v. Javaid Iqbal, et al.
- Docket no.: 07-1015
- Citations: 556 U.S. 662 (more) 129 S. Ct. 1937; 173 L. Ed. 2d 868
- Argument: Oral argument

Case history
- Prior: Motion to dismiss granted in part and denied in part, 2005 WL 2375202 (E.D.N.Y. 2005), affirmed, 490 F.3d 143 (2d Cir. 2005).

Holding
- (1) Top government officials are not liable for the actions of their subordinates absent evidence that they ordered the allegedly discriminatory activity. (2) The heightened fact pleading standards, as required by Bell Atlantic Corp. v. Twombly (2007), apply to all federal court cases

Court membership
- Chief Justice John Roberts Associate Justices John P. Stevens · Antonin Scalia; Anthony Kennedy · David Souter; Clarence Thomas · Ruth Bader Ginsburg; Stephen Breyer · Samuel Alito

Case opinions
- Majority: Kennedy, joined by Roberts, Scalia, Thomas, Alito
- Dissent: Souter, joined by Stevens, Ginsburg, Breyer
- Dissent: Breyer

Laws applied
- Fed. R. Civ. P. 8(a)(2), 12(b)(6)

Ashcroft v. Iqbal, 556 U.S. 662 (2009), is a landmark decision of the Supreme Court of the United States that held that a plaintiff in a civil law case must plead a claim in a "plausible" manner. Alongside Bell Atlantic Corp. v. Twombly (together known as Twiqbal), Iqbal raised the threshold which plaintiffs need to meet to commence a lawsuit. Further, the Court held that government officials are not liable for the actions of their subordinates without evidence that they ordered the allegedly discriminatory activity. At issue was whether current and former federal officials, including FBI Director Robert Mueller and former United States Attorney General John Ashcroft, were entitled to qualified immunity against an allegation that they knew of or condoned racial and religious discrimination against Muslim men detained after the September 11 attacks. The decision also "transformed civil litigation in the federal courts" by making it significantly easier for courts to dismiss individuals' suits.

== Background ==
On the morning of September 11, 2001, Javaid Iqbal, a Pakistani-American cable television installer, was in lower Manhattan when the World Trade Center was attacked. He had been on his way to renew his work authorization card, as he was an immigrant and did not yet have permanent citizenship. In an initially unrelated action eight weeks later, he was arrested on charges of conspiracy to defraud the United States and fraud in relation to identification documents (violations of 18 U.S.C. §§ 371 and 1028), and he was placed in pretrial detention at the Metropolitan Detention Center in Brooklyn, New York. When officers searched his apartment, they found a card for an appointment to be downtown on 9/11, as well as media reporting on the attacks, and suspected him of involvement.

Iqbal alleged that FBI officials carried out a discriminatory policy by designating him as a person "of high interest" in the investigation of the September 11 attacks because of his race, religion, and national origin. He asserted that it was because of his identity as a Pakistani Muslim that he was placed in the detention center's Administrative Maximum Special Housing Unit for over six months while he was awaiting the fraud trial.

Iqbal asserted that he was tortured by prison staff on the orders of, and under policies written by, John Ashcroft. Specifically, he claimed that on the day he was transferred to the special unit, prison guards, without provocation, "picked him up and threw him against the wall, kicked him in the stomach, punched him in the face, and dragged him across the room." He testified that after being attacked a second time, he sought medical attention but was denied care for two weeks. Further, Iqbal asserted that prison staff in the special unit subjected him to unjustified strip and body cavity searches, verbally berated him by calling him a "terrorist" and "Muslim killer," refused to give him adequate food, subjected him to extreme heat and cold, Further, he stated that prison staff interfered with his attempts at prayer, to engage in religious study, and his access to counsel.

Iqbal pleaded guilty to using another man's Social Security card on April 22, 2002, and was sentenced to prison, where he remained until his release on January 15, 2003. While in prison, his wife divorced him, thus invalidating his green card. Iqbal was deported to Pakistan after his release. Upon his return to Pakistan he was branded an American agent. His son was persecuted and forcibly disappeared as a result.

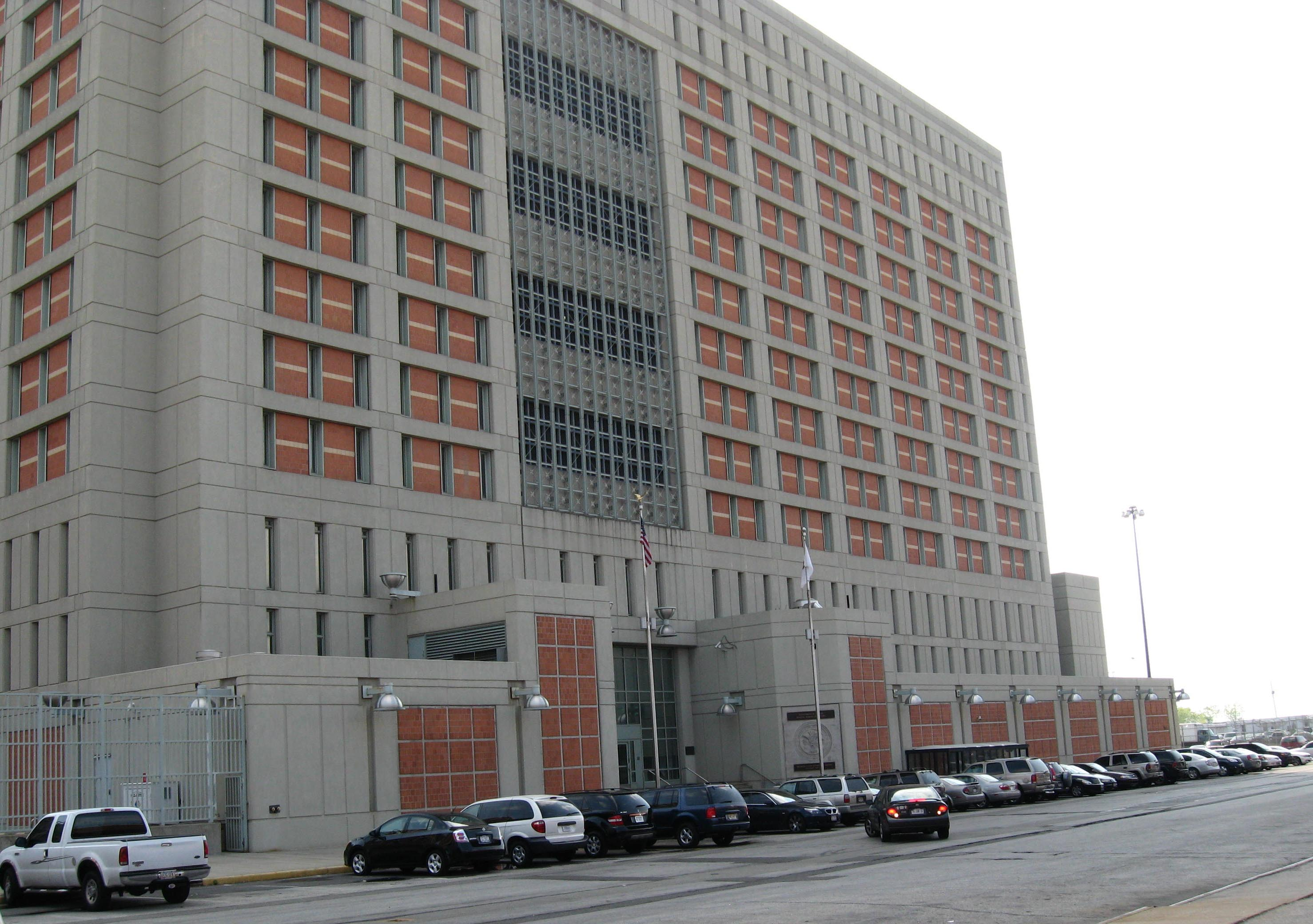
The Metropolitan Detention Center in Brooklyn, New York where Mr. Iqbal was allegedly abused.

After being released, Iqbal brought claims under implied causes of action established by Bivens v. Six Unknown Named Agents for violations of his First, Fourth, Fifth, Sixth, and Eighth Amendment rights as well as various statutory claims, including Federal Tort Claims Act claims against the United States seeking compensatory and punitive damages. Iqbal argued that Mueller and Ashcroft personally condoned the decision to detain him as well as Arab immigrants to the US.

The Office of Inspector General of the Department of Justice had previously investigated and confirmed accounts of abuse of September 11 detainees like Iqbal. The OIG conducted more than one hundred interviews and obtained videotape evidence in its investigation of conditions at the MDC.

The federal government argued that Iqbal's legal filings were not specific enough in linking the government officials with a policy of detaining Arab immigrants and Muslims. The District Court found that the facts alleged in Iqbal's complaint were sufficient. It also found that the OIG Report suggested that petitioners were personally involved in "creating or implementing" the policies that led to respondent's confinement in the Administrative Maximum Special Housing Unit. The United States Court of Appeals for the Second Circuit affirmed the lower court and refused to dismiss the action, concluding that it was plausible enough to survive a Rule 12(b)(6) motion to dismiss.

The Supreme Court granted review, in part, to address "whether conclusory allegations that high-level government officials had knowledge of alleged wrongdoing by subordinate officials are sufficient to survive a motion to dismiss in an action brought under Bivens."

== Decision ==
In a 5–4 decision, delivered on May 18, 2009, by Justice Kennedy, the Supreme Court reversed the Second Circuit's decision that the plaintiff had pleaded sufficient facts. The Supreme Court held that Iqbal's complaint failed to plead sufficient facts to state a claim for purposeful and unlawful discrimination. The court affirmed that the Second Circuit had subject matter jurisdiction to affirm the District Court's order denying petitioners' motion to dismiss.

=== Supervisory liability ===
The Court found that according to precedent, government officials could not be held liable for the unconstitutional conduct of their subordinates because of respondeat superior and also because vicarious liability was inapplicable to Bivens and Section 1983 suits, a plaintiff must plead that each government-official defendant, through the official's own individual actions, has violated the US Constitution.

To do so, the Court found,

[w]here the claim is invidious discrimination in contravention of the First and Fifth Amendments, our decisions make clear the plaintiff must plead and prove that the defendant acted with discriminatory purpose. Church of Lukumi Babalu Aye, Inc. v. Hialeah, 508 U.S. 520, 540–541 (1993) (First Amendment); Washington v. Davis, 426 U.S. 229, 240 (1976) (Fifth Amendment). Under extant precedent purposeful discrimination requires more than "intent as volition or intent as awareness of consequences." Personnel Administrator of Mass. v. Feeney, 442 U.S. 256, 279 (1979). It instead involves a decisionmaker's undertaking a course of action "'because of,' not merely 'in spite of,' [the action's] adverse effects upon an identifiable group." Ibid. It follows that, to state a claim based on a violation of a clearly established right, respondent must plead sufficient factual matter to show that petitioners adopted and implemented the detention policies at issue not for a neutral, investigative reason but for the purpose of discriminating on account of race, religion, or national origin.

The Court rejected Iqbal's argument that under a theory of "supervisory liability," Ashcroft and Mueller could be liable for "knowledge and acquiescence in their subordinates' use of discriminatory criteria to make classification decisions among detainees."

=== Rule 8 pleading standard ===
Under Federal Rule of Civil Procedure 8(a)(2), a complaint must contain a "short and plain statement of the claim showing that the pleader is entitled to relief" and that "detailed factual allegations" are not required. However, the court found that Rule 8 requires the non-moving party to show plausible factual allegations, accepted as true, to "state a claim to relief that is plausible on its face." Bell Atlantic Corp. v. Twombly, 550 U.S. 544, 570 (2007).

A claim has facial plausibility when the pleaded factual content allows the court to draw the reasonable inference that the defendant is liable for the misconduct alleged. (Id. at 556.) In so doing, the Court confirmed that the standard set forth in Conley v. Gibson, 355 U.S. 41 (1957) (the Supreme Court case that had defined the Rule 8 pleading standard prior to Bell Atlantic Corp. v. Twombly) should not be followed in any context. The two cases are often referred to by the portmanteau Twiqbal.

The Court restated the substance and application of the Bell Atlantic Corp. v. Twombly test for the sufficiency of pleadings:

Two working principles underlie our decision in Twombly. First, the tenet that a court must accept as true all of the allegations contained in a complaint is inapplicable to legal conclusions. Second, only a complaint that states a plausible claim for relief survives a motion to dismiss. Determining whether a complaint states a plausible claim for relief will, as the Court of Appeals observed, be a context-specific task that requires the reviewing court to draw on its judicial experience and common sense. In keeping with these principles a court considering a motion to dismiss can choose to begin by identifying pleadings that, because they are no more than conclusions, are not entitled to the assumption of truth. While legal conclusions can provide the framework of a complaint, they must be supported by factual allegations. When there are well-pleaded factual allegations, a court should assume their veracity and then determine whether they plausibly give rise to an entitlement to relief. Our decision in Twombly illustrates the two-pronged approach.

Applying the test to the plaintiff's complaint, the Court held that Iqbal's pleadings did not comply with Rule 8 under Twombly. The Court found that several of his allegations (that petitioners agreed to subject him to harsh conditions as a matter of policy, solely on account of discriminatory factors and for no legitimate penological interest, that Ashcroft was that policy's "principal architect," and that Mueller was "instrumental" in its adoption and execution) were conclusory and not entitled to be assumed true. The Court decided that given that the September 11 attacks were perpetrated by Arab Muslims, it was not surprising that a legitimate policy directing law enforcement to arrest and detain individuals because of their suspected link to the attacks would produce a disparate, incidental impact on Arab Muslims, even if the policy's purpose was to target neither Arabs nor Muslims.

Even if the complaint's well-pleaded facts gave rise to a plausible inference that Iqbal's arrest was the result of unconstitutional discrimination, that inference alone did not entitle him to relief since his claims rested solely on their ostensible policy of holding detainees categorized as "of high interest," but the complaint does not contain facts plausibly showing that their policy was based on discriminatory factors.

The Court rejected three of Iqbal's arguments. Firstly, the Court found that Iqbal's claim that Twombly should be limited to its antitrust context was not supported by that case or the Federal Rules. Secondly, the Court found that Rule 8's pleading requirements need not be relaxed based on the Second Circuit's instruction that the District Court in camera discovery to preserve petitioners' qualified immunity defense in anticipation of a summary judgment motion. Thirdly, the Court found that Rule 9(b), which requires particularity when pleading "fraud or mistake" but allows "other conditions of a person's mind [to] be alleged generally," did not require courts to credit a complaint's conclusory statements without reference to its factual context.

The Supreme Court concluded that the Second Circuit should decide in the first instance whether to remand to the District Court to allow Iqbal to seek leave to amend his complaint. The court of appeals then remanded the case to the district court so that it could decide the issue. Before the trial began, the parties settled out of court. That settlement, unlike the Court's ruling, ended Iqbal's lawsuit against all government officials involved.

Iqbal's claims against lower-level officials, including the guards and supervisors at the detention center, are unaffected by the court's ruling.

=== Souter's dissent ===
Justice Souter, who had written the majority opinion in Twombly, wrote a dissent joined by Justice Stevens, Justice Ginsburg and Justice Breyer, saying that despite the fact that Ashcroft and Mueller had conceded that an officer could be subject to Bivens liability as a supervisor on grounds other than respondeat superior, "[t]he court apparently rejects this concession and... does away with supervisory liability under Bivens. The majority then misapplies the pleading standard under Bell Atlantic Corp. v. Twombly, 550 U.S. 544 (2007), to conclude that the complaint fails to state a claim." Souter went on to say that the main fallacy in the majority's position was that they looked at Iqbal's allegations in isolation and not as a unit. Furthermore, Iqbal was alleging not only that Ashcroft and Mueller had allowed the discrimination policy but also that they had created it.

=== Breyer's dissent ===
Justice Breyer filed a separate dissent, saying that neither the briefs nor the Court's opinion provided convincing grounds for finding that trial courts had inadequate means to prevent unwarranted interference with "the proper execution of the work of the government."

== Impact ==
The decision, referenced with predecessor opinion Bell Atlantic Corp. v. Twombly as "Twiqbal," has been described as possibly "the most consequential ruling in Chief Justice John G. Roberts Jr.'s 10-year tenure" because it has "transformed civil litigation in the federal courts" to the detriment of individuals. It is one of the five most cited Supreme Court decisions of all time. As of 2017, it had been cited over 85,000 times, mostly in lower courts. It has likely made it harder for civil rights cases to proceed through the federal judiciary.

Writing in 2017, Stanford Law professor Shirin Sinnar argued that the case mostly ignored the real center of the case: Iqbal himself. Sinnar noted that the court generalized Iqbal as a suspect and a foreigner, and failed to take in the human dimension of the case. She went on to write that the Court's decision in Iqbal is in many ways discriminatory, and that the Court ignored a true and serious problem around post 9/11 detentions. Many arrests were made on the basis of ethnicity, nationality, and religion, and suspects were jailed under inhumane conditions despite their innocence. Sinnar concluded that the seemingly obtuse tweak to the Rules of Civil Procedure from the case has had a disparate impact on plaintiffs since.

Because "information about wrongdoing is often secret, and plaintiffs need discovery to unearth the facts" about dangerous products or discriminatory practices, courts are "potentially losing cases that could play an important role not only in the lives of plaintiffs but also in the law and society.

Ehad Elmaghraby, an Egyptian who was part of the original suit, settled with the US government for $300,000 before the case would reach the Supreme Court.
