= List of United States Supreme Court cases, volume 141 =

Supreme Court of the United States
- Interactive map of Supreme Court of the United States
- 38°53′26″N 77°00′16″W
- Established: March 4, 1789; 236 years ago
- Location: Washington, D.C.
- Coordinates: 38°53′26″N 77°00′16″W
- Composition method: Presidential nomination with Senate confirmation
- Authorised by: Constitution of the United States, Art. III, § 1
- Judge term length: life tenure, subject to impeachment and removal
- Number of positions: 9 (by statute)
- Website: supremecourt.gov

This is a list of cases reported in volume 141 of United States Reports, decided by the Supreme Court of the United States in 1891.

== Justices of the Supreme Court at the time of volume 141 U.S. ==
The Supreme Court is established by Article III, Section 1 of the Constitution of the United States, which says: "The judicial Power of the United States, shall be vested in one supreme Court . . .". The size of the Court is not specified; the Constitution leaves it to Congress to set the number of justices. Under the Judiciary Act of 1789 Congress originally fixed the number of justices at six (one chief justice and five associate justices). Since 1789 Congress has varied the size of the Court from six to seven, nine, ten, and back to nine justices (always including one chief justice).

When the cases in volume 141 U.S. were decided the Court comprised the following nine members:

| Portrait | Justice | Office | Home State | Succeeded | Date confirmed by the Senate (Vote) | Tenure on Supreme Court |
|---|---|---|---|---|---|---|
| | Melville Fuller | Chief Justice | Illinois | Morrison Waite | July 20, 1888 (41–20) | October 8, 1888 – July 4, 1910 (Died) |
| | Stephen Johnson Field | Associate Justice | California | newly created seat | March 10, 1863 (Acclamation) | May 10, 1863 – December 1, 1897 (Retired) |
| | Joseph P. Bradley | Associate Justice | New Jersey | newly created seat | March 21, 1870 (46–9) | March 23, 1870 – January 22, 1892 (Died) |
| | John Marshall Harlan | Associate Justice | Kentucky | David Davis | November 29, 1877 (Acclamation) | December 10, 1877 – October 14, 1911 (Died) |
| | Horace Gray | Associate Justice | Massachusetts | Nathan Clifford | December 20, 1881 (51–5) | January 9, 1882 – September 15, 1902 (Died) |
| | Samuel Blatchford | Associate Justice | New York | Ward Hunt | March 22, 1882 (Acclamation) | April 3, 1882 – July 7, 1893 (Died) |
| | Lucius Quintus Cincinnatus Lamar | Associate Justice | Mississippi | William Burnham Woods | January 16, 1888 (32–28) | January 18, 1888 – January 23, 1893 (Died) |
| | David Josiah Brewer | Associate Justice | Kansas | Stanley Matthews | December 18, 1889 (53–11) | January 6, 1890 – March 28, 1910 (Died) |
| | Henry Billings Brown | Associate Justice | Michigan | Samuel Freeman Miller | December 29, 1890 (Acclamation) | January 5, 1891 – May 28, 1906 (Retired) |

== Notable court cases ==
=== Marshall v. Holmes ===
In Marshall v. Holmes, 141 U.S. 589 (1891), the Supreme Court held it unconscionable to allow a state court's decision to stand that had been based on documents later exposed as forgeries. It permitted a federal case seeking to set that verdict aside to go forward. Other courts noted shortly afterwards that the invocation of unconscionability seemed to conflict with the Court's holding 13 years earlier in United States v. Throckmorton that equitable relief could not be granted in cases of intrinsic fraud. The Court was asked later in Graver v. Faurot to reconcile the two cases, but declined. As of the early 21st century this issue remains unresolved; some state courts and the Third Circuit Court of Appeals have held that Marshall overruled Throckmorton while others have reaffirmed the latter case.

== Citation style ==
Under the Judiciary Act of 1789 the federal court structure at the time comprised District Courts, which had general trial jurisdiction; Circuit Courts, which had mixed trial and appellate (from the US District Courts) jurisdiction; and the United States Supreme Court, which had appellate jurisdiction over the federal District and Circuit courts—and for certain issues over state courts. The Supreme Court also had limited original jurisdiction (i.e., in which cases could be filed directly with the Supreme Court without first having been heard by a lower federal or state court). There were one or more federal District Courts and/or Circuit Courts in each state, territory, or other geographical region.

The Judiciary Act of 1891 created the United States Courts of Appeals and reassigned the jurisdiction of most routine appeals from the district and circuit courts to these appellate courts. The Act created nine new courts that were originally known as the "United States Circuit Courts of Appeals." The new courts had jurisdiction over most appeals of lower court decisions. The Supreme Court could review either legal issues that a court of appeals certified or decisions of court of appeals by writ of certiorari. The change resulted in an immediate reduction in the Supreme Court's workload (from 623 cases filed in 1890 to 379 in 1891 and 275 in 1892).

Bluebook citation style is used for case names, citations, and jurisdictions.

- "# Cir." = United States Court of Appeals
  - e.g., "3d Cir." = United States Court of Appeals for the Third Circuit
- "C.C.D." = United States Circuit Court for the District of . . .
  - e.g.,"C.C.D.N.J." = United States Circuit Court for the District of New Jersey
- "D." = United States District Court for the District of . . .
  - e.g.,"D. Mass." = United States District Court for the District of Massachusetts
- "E." = Eastern; "M." = Middle; "N." = Northern; "S." = Southern; "W." = Western
  - e.g.,"C.C.S.D.N.Y." = United States Circuit Court for the Southern District of New York
  - e.g.,"M.D. Ala." = United States District Court for the Middle District of Alabama
- "Ct. Cl." = United States Court of Claims
- The abbreviation of a state's name alone indicates the highest appellate court in that state's judiciary at the time.
  - e.g.,"Pa." = Supreme Court of Pennsylvania
  - e.g.,"Me." = Supreme Judicial Court of Maine

== List of cases ==
| Case Name | Page and year | Opinion of the Court | Concurring opinion(s) | Dissenting opinion(s) | Lower Court | Disposition |
|---|---|---|---|---|---|---|
| In re Garnett | 1 (1891) | Bradley | none | none | S.D. Ga. | prohibition denied |
| Pullman's Palace Car Company v. Pennsylvania | 18 (1891) | Gray | none | Bradley | Pa. | affirmed |
| Pullman's Palace Car Company v. Hayward | 36 (1891) | Gray | none | none | C.C.D. Kan. | affirmed |
| Massachusetts v. Western Union Telegraph Company | 40 (1891) | Gray | none | none | C.C.D. Mass. | reversed |
| Crutcher v. Kentucky | 47 (1891) | Bradley | none | none | Ky. | reversed |
| Voight v. Wright | 62 (1891) | Bradley | none | none | Va. Corp. Ct. | reversed |
| Stein v. Bienville Water Supply Company | 67 (1891) | Harlan | none | none | C.C.S.D. Ala. | affirmed |
| Parker v. Ormsby | 81 (1891) | Harlan | none | none | C.C.D. Neb. | reversed |
| Carpenter v. Strange | 87 (1891) | Fuller | none | none | Tenn. | reversed |
| Evans v. State Bank | 107 (1891) | Fuller | none | none | C.C.E.D. La. | affirmed |
| In re Mayfield | 107 (1891) | Brown | none | none | W.D. Ark. | habeas corpus granted |
| Reynolds v. Burns | 117 (1891) | Brown | none | none | C.C.E.D. Ark. | dismissed |
| Denny v. Pironi | 121 (1891) | Brown | none | none | C.C.N.D. Tex. | reversed |
| St. Louis and San Francisco Railway Company v. McBride | 127 (1891) | Brewer | none | none | C.C.W.D. Ark. | affirmed |
| Briggs v. Spaulding | 132 (1891) | Fuller | none | Gray | C.C.N.D.N.Y. | affirmed |
| McAllister v. United States | 174 (1891) | Harlan | none | Field | Ct. Cl. | affirmed |
| Wingard v. United States | 201 (1891) | Harlan | none | Field | Ct. Cl. | affirmed |
| Gorman v. Havird | 206 (1891) | Brown | none | none | Sup. Ct. Terr. Idaho | dismissed |
| Caldwell v. Texas | 209 (1891) | Fuller | none | none | Tex. Civ. App. | dismissed |
| United States v. Griffith | 212 (1891) | Fuller | none | none | Ct. Cl. | dismissed |
| Schutz v. Jordan | 213 (1891) | Brewer | none | none | C.C.S.D.N.Y. | affirmed |
| Gregory Consolidated Mining Company v. Starr | 222 (1891) | Brewer | none | none | Sup. Ct. Terr. Mont. | multiple |
| Pacific National Bank v. Eaton | 227 (1891) | Bradley | none | none | Mass. | reversed |
| Thayer v. Butler | 234 (1891) | Bradley | none | none | C.C.D. Mass. | affirmed |
| Butler v. Eaton | 240 (1891) | Bradley | none | none | C.C.D. Mass. | reversed |
| Tuskaloosa Northern Railway Company v. Gude | 244 (1891) | per curiam | none | none | C.C.N.D. Ala. | dismissed |
| Williams v. Passumpsic Savings Bank | 249 (1891) | Fuller | none | none | C.C.N.D. Fla. | dismissed |
| Union Pacific Railroad Company v. Botsford | 250 (1891) | Gray | none | Brewer | C.C.D. Ind. | affirmed |
| Griswold v. Hazard | 260 (1891) | Harlan | none | Brewer | C.C.D.R.I. | multiple |
| Potter v. Couch | 296 (1891) | Gray | none | none | C.C.N.D. Ill. | affirmed |
| In re Green | 325 (1891) | Field | none | none | Colo. | mandamus denied |
| McNulta v. Lochridge | 327 (1891) | Brown | none | none | Ill. | affirmed |
| Magowan v. New York Belting and Packing Company | 332 (1891) | Blatchford | none | none | C.C.D.N.J. | affirmed |
| Gage v. Bani | 344 (1891) | Harlan | none | none | C.C.N.D. Ill. | affirmed |
| United States v. Missouri, Kansas and Texas Railway Company | 358 (1891) | Harlan | none | none | C.C.D. Kan. | reversed |
| Fowler v. Equitable Trust Company I | 384 (1891) | Harlan | none | none | C.C.S.D. Ill. | reversed |
| Fowler v. Equitable Trust Company II | 408 (1891) | Harlan | none | none | C.C.S.D. Ill. | reversed |
| Fowler v. Equitable Trust Company III | 411 (1891) | Harlan | none | none | C.C.S.D. Ill. | affirmed |
| Hickman v. City of Ft. Scott | 415 (1891) | Harlan | none | none | C.C.D. Kan. | affirmed |
| McClain v. Ortmayer | 419 (1891) | Brown | none | none | C.C.N.D. Ill. | affirmed |
| McLean v. Clapp | 429 (1891) | Brewer | none | none | C.C.N.D. Ill. | affirmed |
| Kneeland v. Luce I | 437 (1891) | Brewer | none | none | C.C.D. Ind. | affirmed |
| Crosby Steam Gage and Valve Company v. Consolidated Safety Valve Company | 441 (1891) | Blatchford | none | none | C.C.D. Mass. | affirmed |
| McCreary v. Pennsylvania Canal Company | 459 (1891) | Brown | none | none | C.C.E.D. Pa. | affirmed |
| American Net and Twine Company v. Worthington | 468 (1891) | Brown | none | none | C.C.D. Mass. | reversed |
| Leadville Coal Company v. McCreery | 475 (1891) | Brewer | none | none | C.C.N.D. Ohio | affirmed |
| Davis v. Patrick | 479 (1891) | Brewer | none | none | C.C.D. Neb. | affirmed |
| Kneeland v. Luce II | 491 (1891) | Blatchford | none | none | C.C.D. Ind. | multiple |
| Seitz v. Brewers' Refrigerating Machine Company | 510 (1891) | Fuller | none | none | C.C.E.D.N.Y. | affirmed |
| Metropolitan National Bank v. Claggett | 520 (1891) | Lamar | none | none | N.Y. Sup. Ct. | affirmed |
| Cross v. Allen | 528 (1891) | Lamar | none | none | C.C.D. Or. | affirmed |
| Adams v. Bellaire Stamping Company | 539 (1891) | Field | none | none | C.C.S.D. Ohio | affirmed |
| Olcott v. Headrick | 543 (1891) | Blatchford | none | none | C.C.E.D. Tenn. | affirmed |
| Rogers v. United States | 548 (1891) | Blatchford | none | none | C.C.S.D.N.Y. | affirmed |
| Rector v. Lipscomb | 557 (1891) | Brewer | none | none | C.C.E.D. Ark. | dismissed |
| Patent Clothing Company, Ltd. v. Glover | 560 (1891) | Brewer | none | none | C.C.S.D.N.Y. | affirmed |
| Fire Insurance Association, Ltd. v. Wickham | 564 (1891) | Brown | none | none | C.C.E.D. Mich. | affirmed |
| In re Lau Ow Bew | 583 (1891) | Fuller | none | none | 9th Cir. | certiorari granted |
| Marshall v. Holmes | 589 (1891) | Harlan | none | none | La. Ct. App. | reversed |
| Johnson v. St. Louis, Iron Mountain and Southern Railway Company | 602 (1891) | Blatchford | none | Lamar | C.C.E.D. Ark. | multiple |
| Moline Plow Company v. Webb | 616 (1891) | Harlan | none | none | C.C.W.D. Tex. | reversed |
| Willcox and Gibbs Sewing Machine Company v. Ewing | 627 (1891) | Harlan | none | none | C.C.E.D. Pa. | reversed |
| Craig v. Continental Insurance Company | 638 (1891) | Blatchford | none | none | C.C.E.D. Mich. | affirmed |
| Thompson v. Barer | 648 (1891) | Harlan | none | none | C.C.N.D. Tex. | affirmed |
| Smyth v. New Orleans Canal and Banking Company | 656 (1891) | Field | none | none | C.C.E.D. La. | affirmed |
| McLish v. Roff | 661 (1891) | Lamar | none | none | U.S. Ct. Indian Terr. | dismissed |
| Ferry v. King County I | 668 (1891) | Fuller | none | none | Wash. | dismissed |
| Ferry v. King County II | 673 (1891) | Fuller | none | none | Wash. | dismissed |
| Myers v. Groom Shovel Company | 674 (1891) | Fuller | none | none | C.C.W.D. Pa. | affirmed |
| Henderson Bridge Company v. City of Henderson | 679 (1891) | Blatchford | none | none | Ky. | dismissed |
| Chicago, St. Paul, Minneapolis and Omaha Railway Company v. Roberts | 690 (1891) | Lamar | none | none | C.C.D. Minn. | dismissed |
| Singer Manufacturing Company v. Wright | 696 (1891) | Field | none | none | C.C.N.D. Ga. | dismissed |
