= Pro hac vice =

Legal term in common law jurisdictions

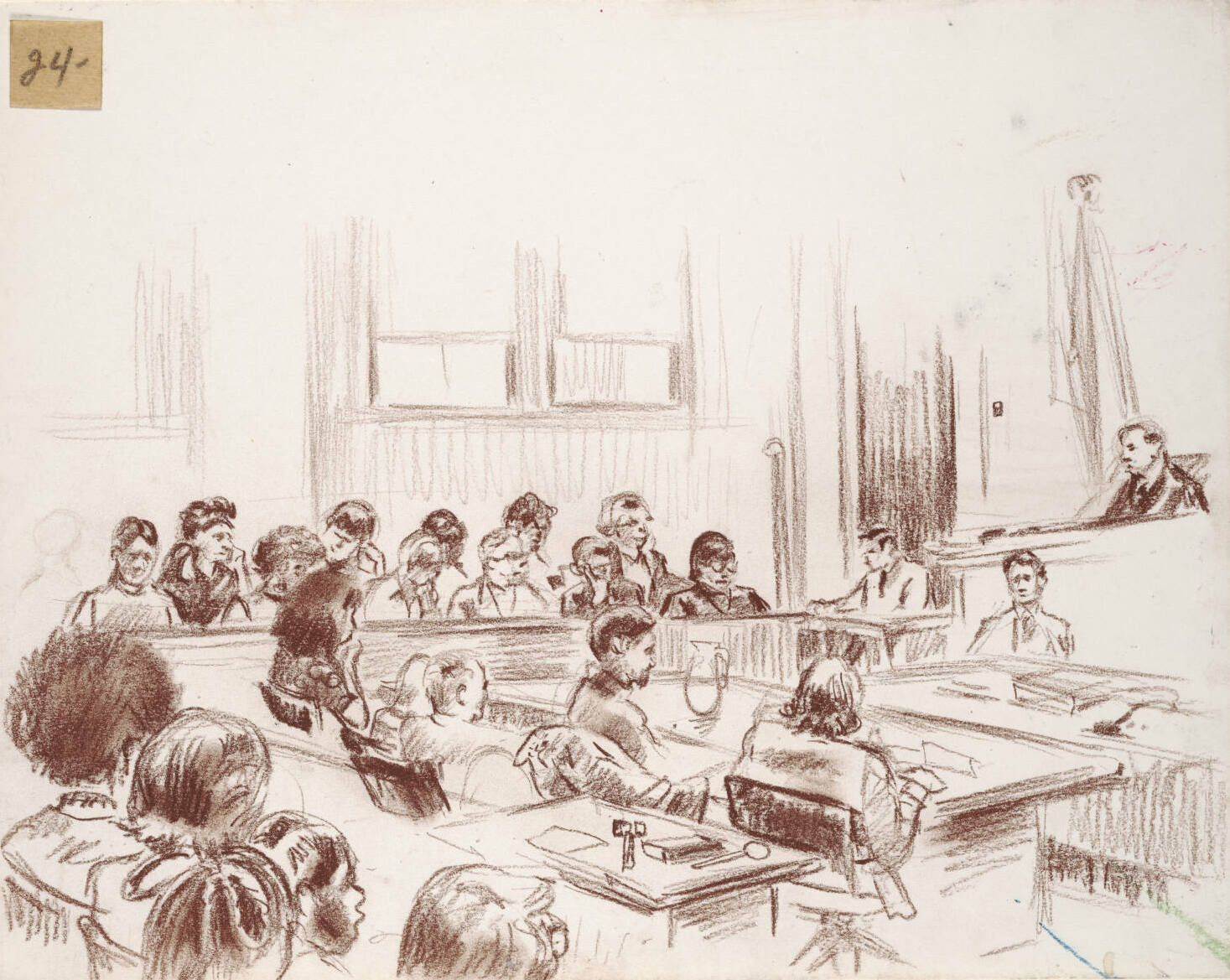
At common law, an attorney not licensed to practice in a particular jurisdiction may be permitted to appear pro hac vice

In the legal field in the United States, admission pro hac vice (English: /proʊ hæk ˈviːtʃeɪ/, Latin for "for this occasion") is a practice in common law jurisdictions whereby a lawyer who has not been admitted to practice in a certain jurisdiction is allowed to participate in a particular case in that jurisdiction. Although pro hac vice admission is available in every American jurisdiction, civil law jurisdictions generally have much stricter rules for multi-jurisdictional practice.

The term has a different meaning when used by the Catholic Church or under maritime law.

== Origins ==
Pro hac vice is Latin "for this occasion" or "for this event" (literally, "for this turn"). The origins of the doctrine of admission pro hac vice have been traced as far back as 1629 in the English Court of Common Pleas. The doctrine appeared in America as early as 1735 in the New York trial of John Peter Zenger for libel, when the Philadelphia attorney Andrew Hamilton was permitted to appear on Zenger's behalf. The term also appeared in the State's 1777 constitution. By 1876, the custom had become "general and uniform" in the United States.

== Modern application in common law jurisdictions ==
The right to appear pro hac vice is not guaranteed, and 50-state surveys have shown that "most jurisdictions intend for pro hac vice admission to be used on a sparing and occasional basis." Generally, the attorney who requests authorization to practice in a jurisdiction within which they are not licensed must specifically request permission from the court to be able to appear as an attorney of record. Depending on the local rules and procedures, this may be accomplished with a motion to appear pro hac vice, in which an attorney who is licensed in the jurisdiction requests that the non‐licensed attorney be admitted to practice in a particular case. In most jurisdictions, an attorney appearing pro hac vice must continue to associate with a locally licensed attorney (referred to as "local counsel"), though the degree to which the local counsel is required or expected to participate in the matter varies widely; some courts may require local counsel to sign documents and appear in court, while others may grant the pro hac vice counsel more independence.

In addition to the motion, the out-of-jurisdiction attorney is typically required to provide the court with a statement from their local bar association indicating that they are a member in good standing and also pay a small fee to the court or its local bar association. For example, there is a $25 annual fee in the United States District Court for the District of Delaware, and the United States District Court for the Southern District of New York charges a $200 fee to file a motion for admission pro hac vice.

== Catholic Church use ==
The expression is also used in the Catholic Church when a titular diocese becomes the title of an archbishop rather than of a bishop. Similarly, when a Cardinal-Deacon is promoted to Cardinal-Priest he usually retains his titular deaconry. This deaconry is then said to be elevated pro hac vice to the rank of a titular church. When referring to a titular diocese or titular deaconry which once was elevated pro hac vice but by now has reverted to its original rank the term pro illa vice is used in church documents.

If, however, a titular archbishop (usually a higher ranked member of the Roman Curia) is appointed diocesan bishop, he is archbishop ad personam for his titular see, and holds the episcopal title of the diocese in addition to the archepiscopal title of the titular see.

== Other uses ==
In maritime law, a demise charterer is considered the owner pro hac vice for limited liability purposes, whereas time or voyage charterers are not.

== Notable examples ==
- Although neither William Jennings Bryan nor Clarence Darrow were licensed to practice law in Tennessee, both were permitted to appear in the Scopes trial.
- In the film Marshall, Thurgood Marshall's pro hac vice motion is depicted being denied by racist officials, forcing a local attorney to serve as lead counsel for the remainder of the trial.
