= List of United States Supreme Court cases, volume 162 =

Supreme Court of the United States
- Interactive map of Supreme Court of the United States
- 38°53′26″N 77°00′16″W
- Established: March 4, 1789; 236 years ago
- Location: Washington, D.C.
- Coordinates: 38°53′26″N 77°00′16″W
- Composition method: Presidential nomination with Senate confirmation
- Authorised by: Constitution of the United States, Art. III, § 1
- Judge term length: life tenure, subject to impeachment and removal
- Number of positions: 9 (by statute)
- Website: supremecourt.gov

This is a list of cases reported in volume 162 of United States Reports, decided by the Supreme Court of the United States in 1896.

== Justices of the Supreme Court at the time of volume 162 U.S. ==
The Supreme Court is established by Article III, Section 1 of the Constitution of the United States, which says: "The judicial Power of the United States, shall be vested in one supreme Court . . .". The size of the Court is not specified; the Constitution leaves it to Congress to set the number of justices. Under the Judiciary Act of 1789 Congress originally fixed the number of justices at six (one chief justice and five associate justices). Since 1789 Congress has varied the size of the Court from six to seven, nine, ten, and back to nine justices (always including one chief justice).

When the cases in volume 162 were decided the Court comprised the following nine members:

Portrait	Justice	Office	Home State	Succeeded	Date confirmed by the Senate (Vote)	Tenure on Supreme Court
	Melville Fuller	Chief Justice	Illinois	Morrison Waite	July 20, 1888 (41–20)	October 8, 1888 – July 4, 1910 (Died)
	Stephen Johnson Field	Associate Justice	California	newly created seat	March 10, 1863 (Acclamation)	May 10, 1863 – December 1, 1897 (Retired)
	John Marshall Harlan	Associate Justice	Kentucky	David Davis	November 29, 1877 (Acclamation)	December 10, 1877 – October 14, 1911 (Died)
	Horace Gray	Associate Justice	Massachusetts	Nathan Clifford	December 20, 1881 (51–5)	January 9, 1882 – September 15, 1902 (Died)
	David Josiah Brewer	Associate Justice	Kansas	Stanley Matthews	December 18, 1889 (53–11)	January 6, 1890 – March 28, 1910 (Died)
	Henry Billings Brown	Associate Justice	Michigan	Samuel Freeman Miller	December 29, 1890 (Acclamation)	January 5, 1891 – May 28, 1906 (Retired)
	George Shiras Jr.	Associate Justice	Pennsylvania	Joseph P. Bradley	July 26, 1892 (Acclamation)	October 10, 1892 – February 23, 1903 (Retired)
	Edward Douglass White	Associate Justice	Louisiana	Samuel Blatchford	February 19, 1894 (Acclamation)	March 12, 1894 – December 18, 1910 (Continued as chief justice)
	Rufus W. Peckham	Associate Justice	New York	Howell Edmunds Jackson	December 9, 1895 (Acclamation)	January 6, 1896 – October 24, 1909 (Died)

== Citation style ==
Under the Judiciary Act of 1789 the federal court structure at the time comprised District Courts, which had general trial jurisdiction; Circuit Courts, which had mixed trial and appellate (from the US District Courts) jurisdiction; and the United States Supreme Court, which had appellate jurisdiction over the federal District and Circuit courts—and for certain issues over state courts. The Supreme Court also had limited original jurisdiction (i.e., in which cases could be filed directly with the Supreme Court without first having been heard by a lower federal or state court). There were one or more federal District Courts and/or Circuit Courts in each state, territory, or other geographical region.

The Judiciary Act of 1891 created the United States Courts of Appeals and reassigned the jurisdiction of most routine appeals from the district and circuit courts to these appellate courts. The Act created nine new courts that were originally known as the "United States Circuit Courts of Appeals." The new courts had jurisdiction over most appeals of lower court decisions. The Supreme Court could review either legal issues that a court of appeals certified or decisions of court of appeals by writ of certiorari.

- "# Cir." = United States Court of Appeals
  - e.g., "3d Cir." = United States Court of Appeals for the Third Circuit
- "C.C.D." = United States Circuit Court for the District of . . .
  - e.g.,"C.C.D.N.J." = United States Circuit Court for the District of New Jersey
- "D." = United States District Court for the District of . . .
  - e.g.,"D. Mass." = United States District Court for the District of Massachusetts
- "E." = Eastern; "M." = Middle; "N." = Northern; "S." = Southern; "W." = Western
  - e.g.,"C.C.S.D.N.Y." = United States Circuit Court for the Southern District of New York
  - e.g.,"M.D. Ala." = United States District Court for the Middle District of Alabama
- "Ct. Cl." = United States Court of Claims
- The abbreviation of a state's name alone indicates the highest appellate court in that state's judiciary at the time.
  - e.g.,"Pa." = Supreme Court of Pennsylvania
  - e.g.,"Me." = Supreme Judicial Court of Maine

== List of cases in volume 162 U.S. ==
Case Name	Page & year	Opinion of the Court	Concurring opinion(s)	Dissenting opinion(s)	Lower Court	Disposition
United States v. Texas	1 (1896)	Harlan	none	none	original	boundary set
Central P.R.R. Co. v. California	91 (1896)	Fuller	none	Field; Harlan	Cal.	affirmed
Southern P.R.R. Co. v. California	167 (1896)	Fuller	none	Field	Cal.	affirmed
Telfener v. Russ	170 (1896)	Field	none	none	5th Cir.	reversed
Cincinnati et al. Ry. Co. v. ICC	184 (1896)	Shiras	none	none	5th Cir.	affirmed
Texas & P. Ry. Co. v. ICC	197 (1896)	Shiras	none	Harlan; Fuller	2d Cir.	reversed
Stanley v. Schwalby	255 (1896)	Gray	none	none	Tex. Civ. App.	reversed
Seneca Nation v. Christy	283 (1896)	Fuller	none	none	N.Y. Sup. Ct.	dismissed
Davis v. Geissler	290 (1896)	Fuller	none	none	C.C.D. Kan.	dismissed
Woodruff v. Mississippi	291 (1896)	Fuller	Field	Peckham	Miss.	reversed
Stevenson v. United States	313 (1896)	Peckham	none	none	C.C.E.D. Tex.	reversed
United States v. Julian	324 (1896)	Brown	none	none	Ct. Cl.	affirmed
Hollander v. Fechheimer	326 (1896)	Brown	none	none	Sup. Ct. D.C.	dismissed
Great W. Tel. Co. v. Purdy	329 (1896)	Gray	none	none	Iowa	affirmed
Great W.T. Co. v. Burnham	339 (1896)	Gray	none	none	Wis. Cir. Ct.	dismissed
Northern P.R.R. Co. v. Peterson	346 (1896)	Peckham	none	none	8th Cir.	reversed
Northern P.R.R. Co. v. Charless	359 (1896)	Peckham	none	none	9th Cir.	reversed
Northern P.R.R. Co. v. Lewis	366 (1896)	Peckham	none	none	9th Cir.	reversed
McIntire v. McIntire	383 (1896)	White	none	none	Sup. Ct. D.C.	affirmed
Palmer v. Barrett	399 (1896)	White	none	none	New York City Ct.	affirmed
Kelsey v. Crowther	404 (1896)	Shiras	none	none	Sup. Ct. Terr. Utah	affirmed
Montgomery v. United States	410 (1896)	Shiras	none	none	C.C.E.D. Tenn.	affirmed
Bryan v. Kales	411 (1896)	Shiras	none	none	Sup. Ct. Terr. Ariz.	affirmed
Bryan v. Brasius	415 (1896)	Shiras	none	none	Sup. Ct. Terr. Ariz.	affirmed
Bryan v. Pinney	419 (1896)	Shiras	none	none	Sup. Ct. Terr. Ariz.	affirmed
Andrews v. United States	420 (1896)	Shiras	none	none	S.D. Cal.	affirmed
Dashiell v. Grosvenor	425 (1896)	Brown	none	none	4th Cir.	affirmed
Graver v. Faurot	435 (1896)	Fuller	none	none	7th Cir.	dismissed
Blagge v. Brooks	439 (1896)	Fuller	none	none	Conn. Super. Ct.	reversed
Wallace v. United States	466 (1896)	Fuller	none	none	D. Kan.	reversed
Campbell v. Porter	478 (1896)	Gray	none	none	Sup. Ct. D.C.	reversed
Oregon et al. Ry. Co. v. Skottowe	490 (1896)	Shiras	none	none	Or.	affirmed
Oregon et al. Ry. Co. v. Conlin	498 (1896)	Shiras	none	none	Or.	affirmed
Alberty v. United States	499 (1896)	Brown	none	none	C.C.W.D. Ark.	reversed
Central P.R.R. Co. v. Nevada	512 (1896)	Brown	none	Field	Nev.	affirmed
Girard L. Ins. & T. Co. v. Cooper	529 (1896)	Brown	none	none	8th Cir.	affirmed
Harwood v. Wentworth	547 (1896)	Harlan	none	none	Sup. Ct. Terr. Ariz.	affirmed
Gibson v. Mississippi	565 (1896)	Harlan	none	none	Miss.	affirmed
Smith v. Mississippi	592 (1896)	Harlan	none	none	Miss.	affirmed
Fee v. Brown	602 (1896)	Brown	none	none	Colo.	affirmed
Wilson v. United States	613 (1896)	Fuller	none	none	C.C.W.D. Ark.	affirmed
Crain v. United States	625 (1896)	Harlan	none	Peckham	D.W. Ark.	reversed
Western Union T. Co. v. James	650 (1896)	Peckham	none	none	Ga.	affirmed
Coffin v. United States	664 (1896)	White	none	none	D. Ind.	affirmed
Putnam v. United States	687 (1896)	White	none	Fuller	C.C.D.N.H.	multiple

== See also ==
- Certificate of division
