= Lyons v. Oklahoma =

- Supreme Court of the United States

Argued April 26, 1944 Decided June 5, 1944
- Full case name: Lyons v. Oklahoma
- Citations: 322 U.S. 596 (more) 64 S. Ct. 1208; 88 L. Ed. 1481

Holding
- The jury's decisions that the effects of the police's violent coercion of the first confession had dissipated prior to his second confession and that the latter was voluntary, and the subsequent conviction, did not violate due process or the defendant's Fourteenth Amendment rights.

Court membership
- Chief Justice Harlan F. Stone Associate Justices Owen Roberts · Hugo Black; Stanley F. Reed · Felix Frankfurter; William O. Douglas · Frank Murphy; Robert H. Jackson · Wiley B. Rutledge

Case opinions
- Majority: Reed, joined by Stone, Roberts, Frankfurter, Jackson
- Concurrence: Douglas
- Dissent: Murphy, joined by Black
- Dissent: Rutledge

Lyons v. Oklahoma, 322 U.S. 596 (1944), was a United States Supreme Court case about the beatings and subsequent coerced confessions of William Douglas Lyons, a man convicted of a triple murder in Oklahoma. His attorneys included Thurgood Marshall.

== History ==
William Douglas Lyons was a 21-year-old illiterate African American sharecropper. For several hours, Lyons was beaten with a blackjack weapon. Eventually he said he murdered a white family and burned down their home in Choctaw County.

Thurgood Marshall travelled to Oklahoma to assist the defense shortly after the trial of Joseph Spell. Marshall cross-examined the police who were involved. Marshall had a strong case asserting Lyons's innocence, however the judge allowed for a jury's determination. The jury decided that the second confession by Lyon's, given twelve hours after his beatings had ended, was a voluntary confession.

The case was overshadowed by early events related to World War II and the court's decision on the Sherman Act.

=== Outcome ===
Lyons was paroled in 1961 and pardoned by the Governor of Oklahoma in 1965 after 20 years in prison. He subsequently disappeared into obscurity. Lyons was spared the death penalty in the case, despite the gruesome nature of the murder, after his defense exposed abuses by police and officials. Many observers thought he would be cleared after problems with the case against him were exposed at trial. Marshall was troubled by the outcome and believed there was strong evidence of his client's innocence. The case highlighted issues of what constituted a forced confession. Some observers also suggested the murder may have been carried out by poorly supervised prisoners at a nearby work camp and Lyons used as a scapegoat to avoid bad publicity and possible investigations of local law officers and politicians.

A photo of Lyons with six policemen and attorneys is held by the Library of Congress. An appeal to the U.S. Supreme Court failed, the majority deciding, over a strong dissent, that a series of beatings, long interrogations and threats to induce a confession do not render a second confession 11 hours later involuntary.

== See also ==
- Chambers v. Florida
- Groveland Four
