= List of United States Supreme Court cases, volume 322 =

This is a list of all the United States Supreme Court cases from volume 322 of the United States Reports:

Case name	Citation	Date decided
Chicago, St. Paul, M. & O.R.R. Co. v. United States	322 U.S. 1	1944
Pollock v. Williams	322 U.S. 4	1944
United States v. Marshall Transp. Co.	322 U.S. 31	1944
The Anaconda v. American Sugar Refining Co.	322 U.S. 42	1944
Great N. Life Ins. Co. v. Read	322 U.S. 47	1944
United States v. Mitchell (1944)	322 U.S. 65	1944
Southern Ry. Co. v. United States (1944)	322 U.S. 72	1944
United States v. Ballard	322 U.S. 78	1944
United States v. American Sur. Co.	322 U.S. 96	1944
Clifford F. MacEvoy Co. v. United States ex rel. Calvin Tomkins Co.	322 U.S. 102	1944
NLRB v. Hearst Publications, Inc.	322 U.S. 111	1944
Allen Calculators, Inc. v. Nat'l Cash Register Co.	322 U.S. 137	1944
Ashcraft v. Tennessee (1944)	322 U.S. 143	1944
United States v. Allegheny County	322 U.S. 174	1944
United States v. Wabash R.R. Co.	322 U.S. 198	1944
Union Brokerage Co. v. Jensen	322 U.S. 202	1944
Kansas v. Missouri	322 U.S. 213	1944
Huddleston v. Dwyer	322 U.S. 232	1944
Hazel-Atlas Glass Co. v. Hartford-Empire Co.	322 U.S. 238	1944
Shawkee Mfg. Co. v. Hartford-Empire Co.	322 U.S. 271	1944
Douglas v. IRS	322 U.S. 275	1944
Northwest Airlines, Inc. v. Minnesota	322 U.S. 292	1944
McLeod v. J.E. Dilworth Co.	322 U.S. 327	1944
General Trading Co. v. State Tax Comm'n	322 U.S. 335	1944
International Harvester Co. v. Department of Treasury	322 U.S. 340	1944
United States v. Hellard	322 U.S. 363	1944
Mortensen v. United States	322 U.S. 369	1944
Columbia Gas & Electric Corp. v. American Fuel & Power Co.	322 U.S. 379	1944
United States v. Saylor	322 U.S. 385	1944
Keefe v. Clark	322 U.S. 393	1944
L.P. Steuart & Bro., Inc. v. Bowles	322 U.S. 398	1944
Crites, Inc. v. Prudential Ins. Co.	322 U.S. 408	1944
Arenas v. United States	322 U.S. 419	1944
International Harvester Co. v. Wisconsin Dept. of Taxation	322 U.S. 435	1944
De Castro v. City of San Juan	322 U.S. 451	1944
Mercado e Hijos v. Commins	322 U.S. 465	1944
Universal Oil Prods. Co. v. Globe Oil & Refin. Co.	322 U.S. 471	1944
Feldman v. United States	322 U.S. 487	1944
ICC v. City of Jersey City	322 U.S. 503	1944
Wisconsin Gas & Elec. Co. v. United States	322 U.S. 526	1944
United States v. Southeastern Underwriters Ass'n	322 U.S. 533	1944
Lyons v. Oklahoma	322 U.S. 596	1944
Addison v. Holly Hill Fruit Prods., Inc.	322 U.S. 607	1944
Polish Nat'l All. v. NLRB	322 U.S. 643	1944
Kansas v. Missouri	322 U.S. 654	1944
Baumgartner v. United States	322 U.S. 665	1944
Hartzel v. United States	322 U.S. 680	1944
United States v. White (1944)	322 U.S. 694	1944
