= McAllister v. United States =

- Supreme Court of the United States

Argued March 24, 1891 Decided May 25, 1891
- Full case name: McAllister v. United States
- Citations: 141 U.S. 174 (more)

Holding
- Congress may provide for the at-will removal of territorial offices, even if such officers exercise judicial functions.

Court membership
- Chief Justice Melville Fuller Associate Justices Stephen J. Field · Joseph P. Bradley; John M. Harlan · Horace Gray; Samuel Blatchford · Lucius Q. C. Lamar II; David J. Brewer · Henry B. Brown

Case opinions
- Majority: Harlan, joined by Fuller, Bradley, Blatchford, Lamar, Brewer
- Dissent: Field, joined by Gray, Brown

Laws applied
- U.S. Const. art. II, § 2, cl. 2

McAllister v. United States, 141 U.S. 174 (1891), was a United States Supreme Court case in which the court held that Congress may provide for the at-will removal of territorial offices, even if such officers exercise judicial functions. The office in this case, a federal judgeship in Alaska Territory, presided over an Article IV tribunal called a territorial court.

== Background ==
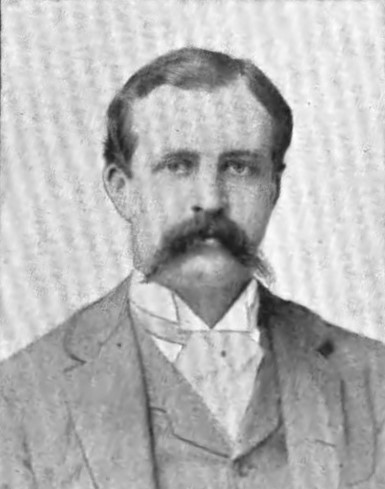
Ward McAllister, Jr.

Ward McAllister, Jr., was appointed by President Chester A. Arthur, by and with the advice and consent of the Senate, to be the inaugural District Judge for the District of Alaska's territorial court. The District presided over Alaska Territory. McAllister's commission, of July 5, 1884, authorized and empowered him to fulfill the duties of that office and hold it with all the privileges that entailed "for the term of four years from the day of the date hereof, and until his successor shall be appointed and qualified, subject to the conditions prescribed by law." McAllister took the required oath of office on August 23, 1884.

On the July 21, 1885, President Grover Cleveland decreed that McAllister was to be suspended from his office "by virtue of the authority conferred upon the President of the United States by § 1768 of the Revised Statutes of the United States" until the end of the next session of the Senate. Cleveland designated Edward J. Dawne to fill the position in the meantime. Dawne took the prescribed oath of office on August 20, 1885.

On December 3, 1885, Cleveland suspended Dawne under the same statute and designated Lafayette Dawson to fill the position. Dawson took the required oath of office December 16, 1885. Having been nominated and, by and with the advice and consent of the Senate, appointed to this position, Dawson was commissioned August 2, 1886, for the term of four years from that date, and until his successor should be appointed and qualified, subject to the provisions prescribed by law. He took the oath of office again on September 3, 1886.

McAllister vacated the office without resistance on August 28, 1885 and received his salary through that date. The salary appropriated for the period between August 29, 1885, and March 12, 1886, inclusive, had not been paid to anyone and essentially remained in escrow held by the Treasury Department. Judge Dawson received the salary after March 12, except for the period between August 6, 1886 and September 2, 1886; the salary for that period was also held in escrow.

McAllister filed a lawsuit to determine his right or title to the office in question after the day he vacated it. Primarily, he claimed that he was entitled to $3070 for the period between August 29, 1885 and September 6, 1886 because he was entitled to hold the office of district judge for the District of Alaska for four years from the date of his commission and until his successor was appointed and qualified. He had two alternative theories. His second theory was that his right to perform the duties continued until September 3, 1886, when Judge Dawson qualified, which would entitle him to $3,041.09. His third theory was entitled to the salary from the first day after the end of the session of the Senate, August 7, 1886, to September 3, 1886, when his successor qualified. That would entitle him to $221.91.

The government opposed McAllister by pointing to the version of § 1768 of the Revised Statutes that was in effect when McAllister was in office. That statute was repealed in 1887, but the old text remained in effect for judges installed while it was valid.

== Opinion of the court ==
The Supreme Court issued an opinion on May 25, 1891. The court held that a person appointed by the President, by and with the advice and consent of the Senate, to be the a judge of a federal district court presiding over a U.S. territory is not a judge of a court of the United States within the meaning of the exception in § 1768 of the Revised Statutes, relating to the tenure of office of civil officers. Prior to the repeal of that law, the judge was subject to removal before the expiration of his term of office by the President, in the manner and upon the conditions set forth in that section. The decision explicitly declined to say anything about the law after the 1877 appeal.
