= Newsboys' strike of 1899 =

American campaign

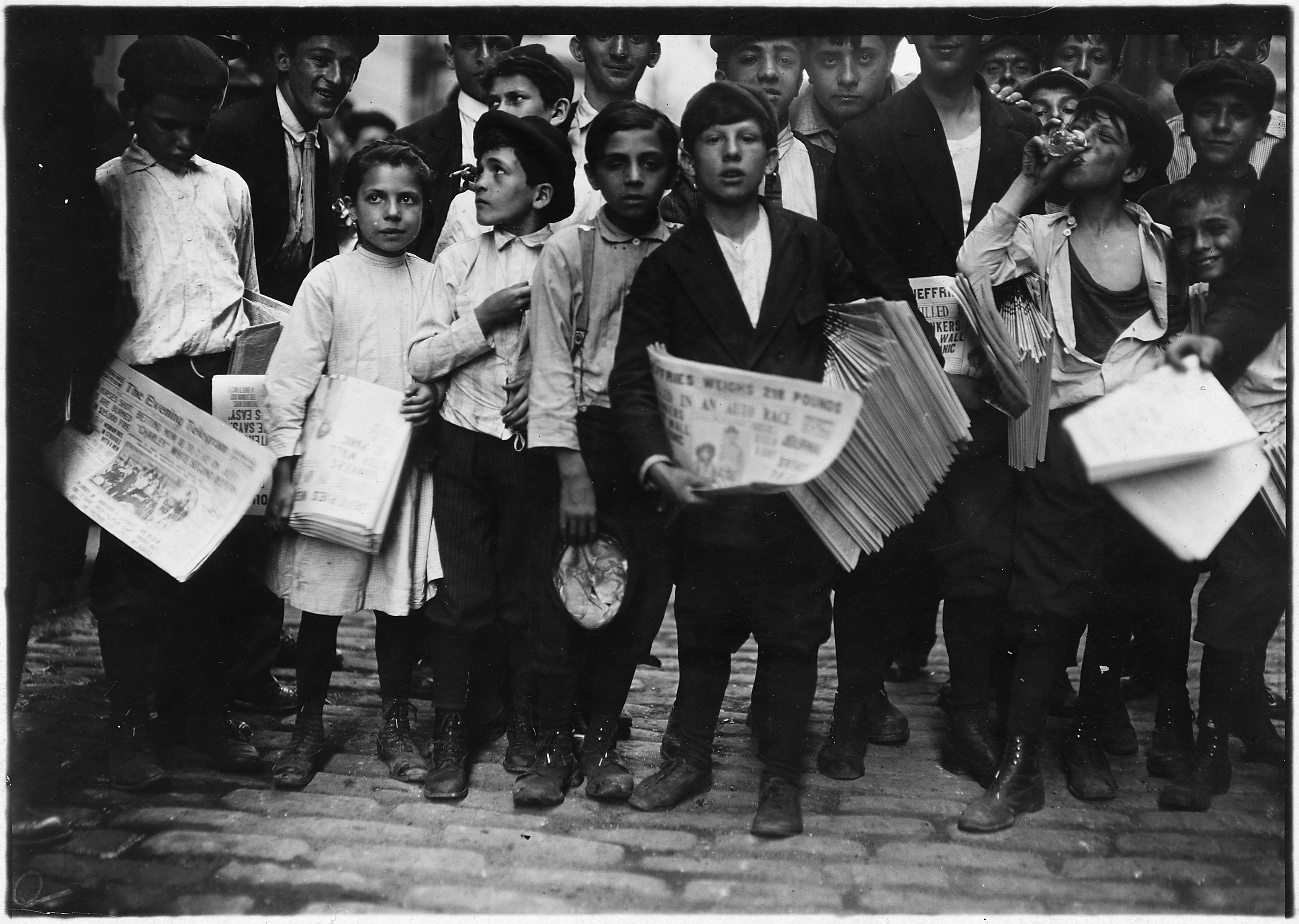
- Newsboys and newsgirl getting afternoon papers in New York City (1910)
- Date: July 18 – August 2, 1899
- Location: New York City
- Methods: Striking

Parties
Newsboys	New York World; New York Journal

Lead figures
Louis "Kid Blink" Baletti (strike leader); David Simmons (union president)	Joseph Pulitzer (publisher of the NY World); William Randolph Hearst (publisher of the NY Journal)

The newsboys' strike of 1899 was a U.S. youth-led campaign to facilitate change in the way that Joseph Pulitzer and William Randolph Hearst's newspapers compensated their force of newsboys. The strikers demonstrated across New York City for several days, effectively stopping circulation of the two papers, along with the news distribution for many New England cities. The strike lasted two weeks, causing Pulitzer's New York World to decrease its circulation from 360,000 papers sold per day to 125,000. Although the price of papers was not lowered, the strike was successful in forcing the World and the New York Evening Journal to offer full buybacks to their sellers, thus increasing the amount of money that newsboys received for their work. This event inspired the 1992 movie musical, Newsies, which was adapted for the stage, opening on Broadway on March 29, 2012.

== Background ==
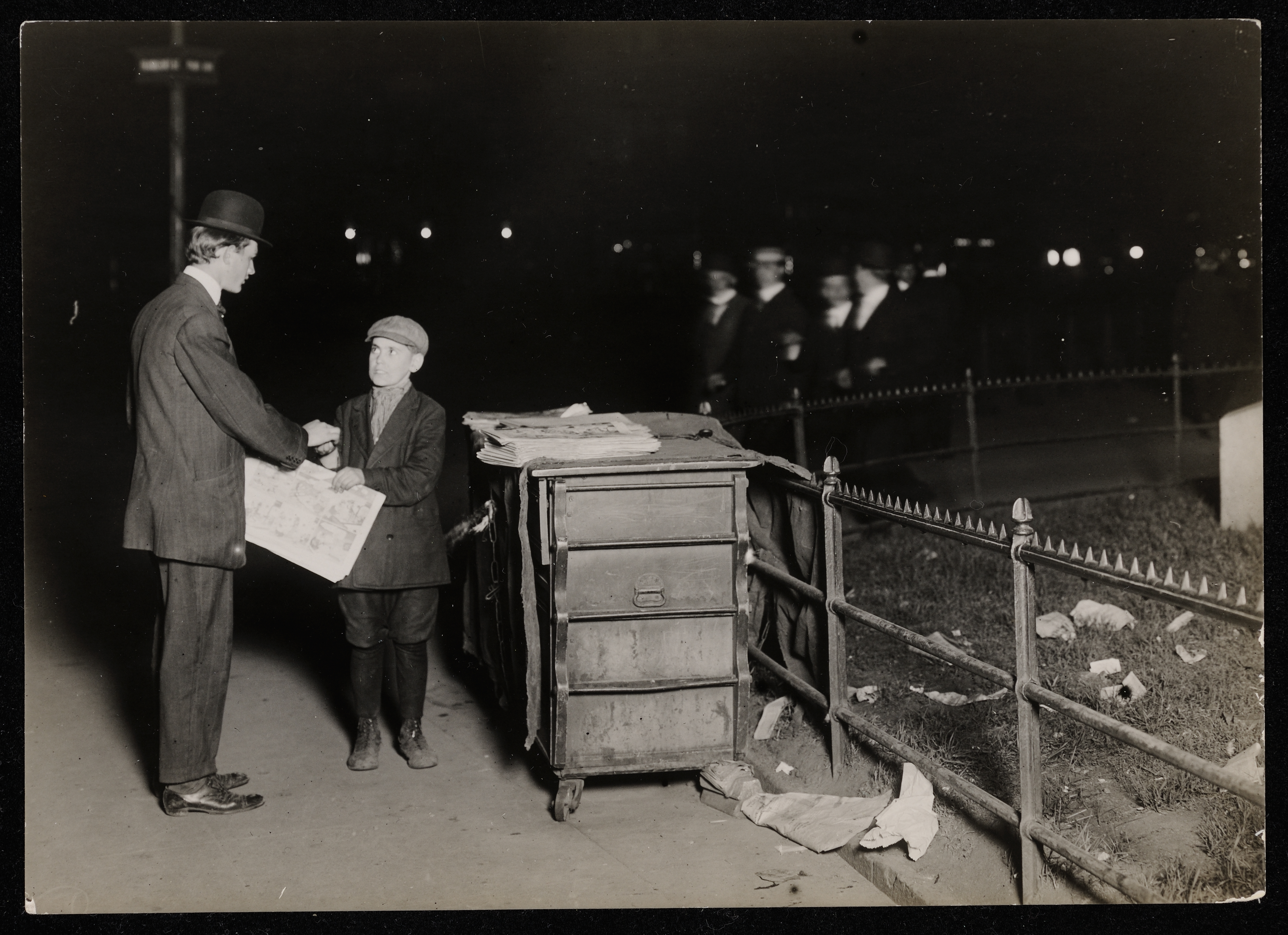
Newsies often worked late, past midnight. Above, a newsboy working in New York (1910).

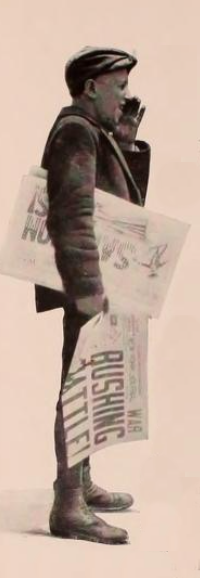
A New York City newsboy in 1899 (by D. Appleton)

At the turn of the century, newsboys were essential to newspaper distribution. While morning editions of the paper were often delivered directly to subscribers, the afternoon editions relied almost exclusively on newsboys to sell. Most of the newsboys came from poor immigrant families and sold papers in the afternoons and evenings, after their school activities. They bought papers at 50¢ per hundred and sold them at 1 cent each, for a profit of half a cent per paper.

There were newsboy strikes several years before the events of 1899, including those in 1886, 1887, and 1889. The last notable strike that the newsboys held against the World and the Journal was in August 1889.

In 1898, with the Spanish–American War increasing newspaper sales, several publishers raised the cost of a newsboy's bundle of 100 newspapers from 50¢ to 60¢, The Evening World (the World) and the New York Evening Journal (the Journal) were two publishers that raised its prices, and while the newsboys did not protest at the time, they later felt the financial consequences of the increased prices when the war ended.

== Strike ==
=== Early days ===
On July 18, 1899, a group of newsboys in Long Island City turned over a distribution wagon for the New York Journal. In City Hall Park a day later, they officially formed The Newsboy Union and declared a strike against the papers of Joseph Pulitzer, publisher of the World, and William Randolph Hearst, publisher of the Journal, until prices were rolled back to 50¢ per hundred. The newsboys of Manhattan and Brooklyn were quick to follow on July 20. The newsboys of Jersey City also joined, decided at a meeting they held by the ferry at Exchange Place. There were originally three hundred newsboys in the strike, but as more regions of New York joined, there may have been three thousand members. The union requested to speak with the World and the Journal, but because the newsboys were children, they did not respond back.

The newsboys' methods were violent in the early days of the strike. Anybody found to be selling the two boycotted papers would be mobbed by a group of strikers, beaten, and his papers destroyed. They would also mob wagons and drivers distributing the papers. Women and girls fared a little better because, as union leader Kid Blink put it, "A feller can't soak a lady." The newspaper owners paid grown men to sell their papers, offering them police protection, but the strikers often found ways to distract the officers so they could get at the "scabs." Many of the men did not show up to work because they sympathized with the newsboys.

The newsboys distributed banners, pins, pamphlets, and flyers, encouraging people to help them in their cause by not buying the World and the Journal. Eventually, advertisers either removed their advertisements from the papers or requested for the prices to decrease because newspapers were not being circulated, or possibly because they empathized with the newsboys.

==== The Journal and World's price decrease ====
The World started selling newspapers for 3¢ each c. July 21, 1899. Many newsboys accepted the deal, but Moses Burris, one of the strike leaders, wanted a written agreement from the World stating that the price would be permanent. Since there was no agreement, Burris told the newsboys to not sell the "scab papes". When information circulated that the Journal started selling its newspapers for 5¢ each, many newsboys were willing to take the deal, but Burris, along with newsboys John Gallupo and Louis Kirlow, stopped them.

The World started to give its newspapers away for free, and when six newsboys were about to take the newspapers, Burris, Gallupo, Kirlow, and around 12 other newsboys attacked them. A police officer came and arrested the three boys; Kirlow was sent to a Juvenile Asylum, and Burris and Gallupo were taken in by Healing New York.

One hundred newsboys, shouting and banging sticks, marched down Nassau Street protesting the price changes. Some had makeshift banners reading "WE DON'T SELL SCAB PAPERS", and any scabs would be attacked by the group. Crowds started to watch them protest, and newspaper stands started cancelling their newspaper orders. The newsboys celebrated this, and said that because the newspaper companies kept lowering its prices, they were weakening and would accept any deal.

=== Rally at Irving Hall ===
On July 24, 1899, the newsboys held a city-wide rally at Irving Hall sponsored by state senator, Timothy D. Sullivan. An estimated five thousand boys from Manhattan attended the rally, along with two thousand boys from Brooklyn and several hundreds from other areas of the city. The newsboys planned to have a parade before the meeting began, but Chief of Police William Devery refused to issue the necessary permit.

Many local businessmen and politicians addressed the crowd, including lawyer Leonard A. Suitkin, Frank B. Wood, and ex-Assemblyman Phil Wissig. When the adults had finished speaking, the union president, David Simmons, read a list of resolutions saying that the strike was to stand until the papers reduced their prices, and also calling on the newsboys to adopt non-violent methods of resistance.

Other speeches were made by "Warhorse" Brennan, Jack Tietjen, "Bob the Indian", union leader "Kid Blink", "Crazy" Arborn, Annie Kelly, and Brooklyn union leader, "Racetrack" Higgins. The night ended with a song sung by "Hungry Joe" Kernan.

A floral horseshoe was awarded to Kid Blink as a reward for giving the best speech of the evening.

=== After the rally ===
In the days following the rally, the newsboys' tactics changed to be largely non-violent. Even though they were no longer beating people who sold the World and Journal, the strike was still effective because the public was on their side and chose not to buy the papers, even if they were for sale.

On July 26, 1899, the newsboys planned a parade, where as many as 6,000 boys would march, accompanied by a band and fireworks, but this parade never happened due to issues with obtaining a permit.

The attention the strike was getting from the public prompted an official statement from the Journal, stating that the newsboys were independent contractors and therefore could not form a union. It believed that the strike was actually a boycott. It also stated the Journal bought back any newspapers the newsboys did not sell, but that was false. However, this would be the compromise reached at the end of the strike. The World would announce on July 30th, 1899, that the strike had ended, but that was also not true.

=== Kid Blink disgraced ===
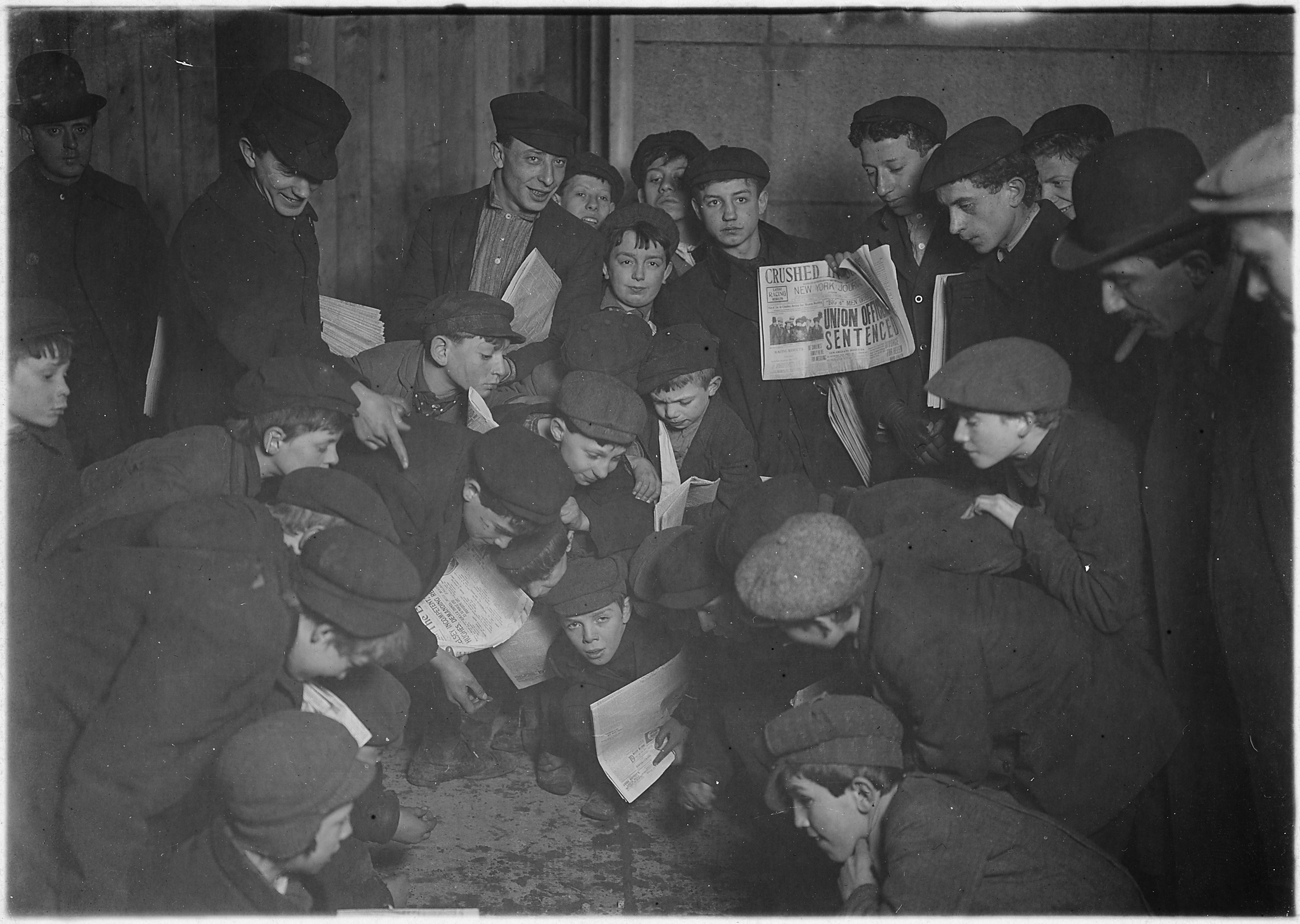
Newsboys amusing themselves while waiting (1908)

On July 26, 1899, rumors spread among the newsboys that strike leaders, Kid Blink and David Simmons, had agreed to sell the boycotted papers in exchange for a bribe from the newspaper executives. Both boys denied the charges, but some newspapers note that Kid Blink wore clothes a bit nicer than usual, indicating he may have accepted a bribe. In response to these suspicions, Kid Blink and David Simmons resigned from their leadership positions, Simmons changing from union president to treasurer, and Kid Blink becoming a walking delegate.

That night, Kid Blink was chased through the streets by a group of boys angry because of the rumors. A police officer, seeing the group of running boys, assumed that Kid Blink was the leader and arrested him for disorderly conduct. Kid Blink was given a fine and let go, while a group of newsboys outside the court jeered at him.

A few days later, Kid Blink won a bet on a horse race. He walked down Park Row in nice clothing: a checkered suit, a red tie, tan shoes, and a straw hat with a blue polka-dot band around it. He also held a cane. Kid Blink asked the newsboys there "I don’t think there is much in this strike, do youse?...dis is no way to make money. Dese people can beat us hands down". After, one of the newsboys threw a piece of pavement at him, to which he ran into the Sun building. A policeman followed him in, arrested him, and brought him home. He was later charged with disorderly conduct and fined $5. Later, newsboys held banners reading: "Kid the Blink, He’s in the Clink. Dave Fitzimmons, He’s Our Old Persimmon."

=== The end of the strike ===
After the rumors about Kid Blink and David Simmons' desertion of the strike, combined with their failure to obtain a parade permit, the newsboys' faith in centralized leadership was diminished. Other newsboys stepped up to lead the strikers, but none of them had the same level of power and influence that Kid Blink once had.

On August 1, 1899, the World and the Journal offered the newsboys a compromise: the price of a hundred papers would remain at 60¢, but they would buy back any unsold papers. This meant that the boys who had trouble selling all their papers would not be forced to sell late into the night to avoid taking a loss for the day. The newsboys accepted this compromise, ended the strike and disbanded the union on August 2, 1899. The World would continue to assert that there was no strike, but an "unorganized movement led by those who hoped to gain public confidence by lying about their successful rivals".

== Strike leaders ==
The leadership of the newsboy strike was less centralized than most unions, with boys in each neighborhood feeling more loyalty to the other boys in their area than to the centralized leadership. That said, some boys were more influential than others, organizing rallies, acting as spokespeople for the strike, and being interviewed by papers such as the New York Tribune, New York Sun or New York Herald. The papers often quoted the strikers with their New York accents, depicted as an eye dialect, using such sayings as "Me nobul men is all loyal."

=== Louis "Kid Blink" Baletti ===
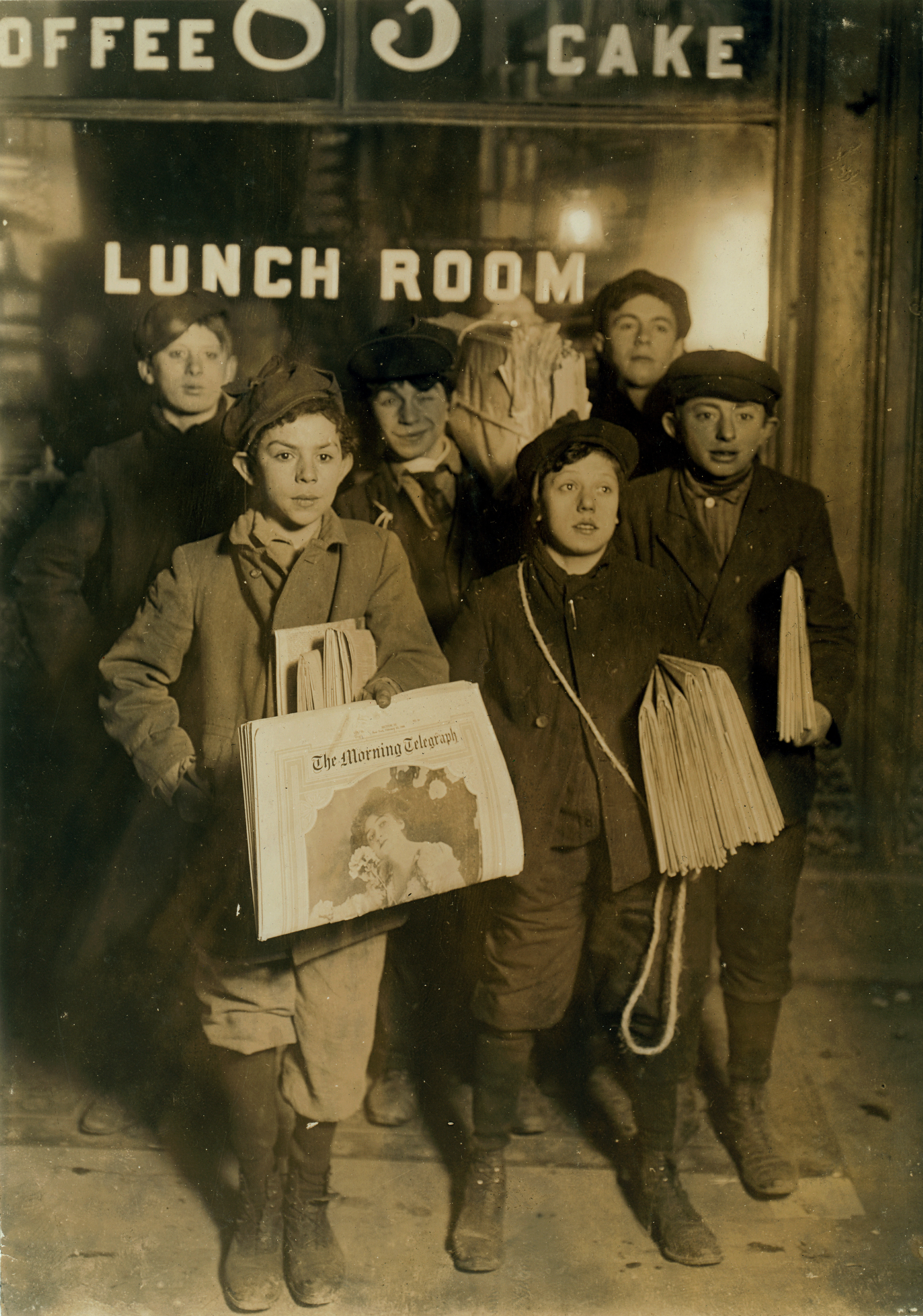
Boys selling newspapers on Brooklyn Bridge (1908)

The face of the strike was Louis "Kid Blink" Baletti. Kid Blink was 18 during the strike, and was described by papers at the time as an "undersized boy" with red hair and an eye patch over his left eye. He also went by the nicknames "Red Blink," "Muggsy McGee" and "Blind Diamond."

Kid Blink was a charismatic leader. Several newspapers recorded speeches, which he gave at rallies, one of which reads in part "Friens and feller workers. This is a time, which tries de hearts of men. Dis is de time when we've got to stick together like glue... We know what we want and we'll get it even if we are blind." His speech at the Irving Hall rally won him a floral horseshoe for the best speech of the evening.

Kid Blink was accused of betraying the strike and accepting a bribe to sell the boycotted papers, and though some sources claim he was acquitted of these charges, he still stepped down from his leadership position after being accused.

When he was arrested during the strike, Kid Blink told the police his name was Louis Ballat, but he was likely lying or they misheard because his real name appears to have been Louis Baletti.

After the strike, Kid Blink got a job as a cart driver and later as a saloon keeper. He may have also worked as the right-hand man to New York mobster Chuck Connors. He died in July 1913 at the age of 32 of tuberculosis.

=== David Simmons ===
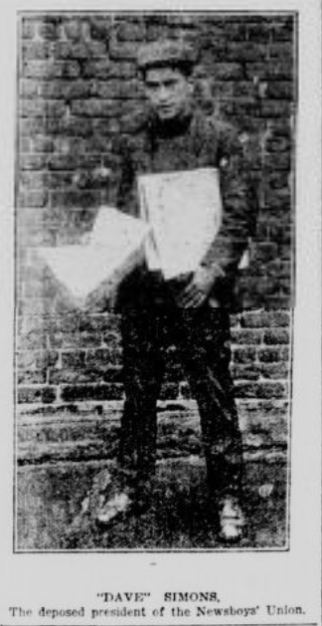
Dave Simmons, first president of the Newsboys' union. (1899)

David Simmons was president of the newsboy union at the beginning of the strike, and treasurer in the second half, after he was accused of betraying the strike and was forced to step back from his leadership role. He was twenty-one at the time of the strike and had been selling newspapers since the age of eight. He was also a well-known amateur prizefighter at the local athletic clubs.

Simmons read a list of resolutions at the rally at Irving Hall, which the crowd reportedly found quite boring.

=== Ed "Racetrack" Higgins ===
Ed "Racetrack" Higgins was the leader of the Brooklyn union, and was elected vice-president of the general union after Kid Blink and David Simmons were accused of selling out. Higgins was a fixture at the Sheepshead Bay Race Track, and referenced horses in many quotes at the time of the strike.

Higgins was a charismatic speaker; several papers mentioned his use of humor in his speeches to the striking newsboys. Brooklyn Life referred to him as "a born leader of boys, and he may yet be of men." His speech at the rally went off so well that the New York Times said that "If the newsboys present could have had a vote last night, 'Race Track Higgins' could have had any office in their gift."

=== Morris Cohen ===
Morris Cohen was union president after Kid Blink and David Simmons stepped down. Very little is known about him, but a July 20 memo from Joseph Pulitzer's business manager, Don Seitz, named Cohen as the boy who started the strike in New York City.

=== Henry "Major Butts" Butler ===
Henry "Major Butts" Butler was leader of the Upper Manhattan union after Kid Blink stepped down. He was arrested on July 31, 1899, on a charge of blackmail after telling executives at the New York World that he would not break the strike for less than $600 ($600 in 1900 is roughly equivalent to $23,000 in 2025).

=== Annie Kelly ===
Annie Kelly, also known as "Annie of the Sun office", was one of the few newswomen loyal to the strike, a fact that made her very popular with the striking newsboys, who saw her as "almost a patron saint." She was the only woman to speak at the rally at Irving Hall, after being pulled on stage by a crowd of cheering newsboys, where she told them "All I can say, boys, is to stick together and we'll win. That's all I've got to say to you."

== Legacy ==
The newsboys' strike of 1899 has been credited with inspiring later strikes, including the Butte, Montana newsboys' strike of 1914, and a 1920s strike in Louisville, Kentucky.

Some decades later, the introduction of urban child-welfare practices led to improvements in the newsboys' quality of life.

== Cultural representations ==
The newsboys were fictionalized in 1942 by DC Comics as the Newsboy Legion, first appearing in issue number 7 of Star Spangled Comics and continuing therein, through issue 64, as well as in various forms, including the modern-day comics.

The events of the 1899 strike later inspired the 1992 Disney film Newsies, including a character named Kid Blink (who wears an eye patch), but in this version of the story, the leader of the strike was a fictional character named Jack Kelly. A musical theatre adaptation of the film, also called Newsies, debuted in 2011 and played on Broadway from 2012 to 2014, and on tour from 2014 to 2016. A live filmed version of the stage production with cast members from both the Broadway and Tour productions was digitally released on May 23, 2017, on Netflix and later switched to Disney+. In November 2022, a production of Newsies opened Off West End in London for a limited run.

The newsboy strike is described in detail in the 2003 non-fiction book Kids on Strike!

== See also ==
- Child labor in the United States
- NLRB v. Hearst Publications
