= NLRB v. Hearst Publications =

- Supreme Court of the United States

Argued February 8–9, 1944 Decided April 24, 1944
- Full case name: National Labor Relations Board v. Hearst Publications, Inc
- Citations: 322 U.S. 111 (more) 64 S. Ct. 851; 88 L. Ed. 1170; 1944 U.S. LEXIS 1201; 8 Lab. Cas. (CCH) ¶ 51,179; 14 L.R.R.M. 614

Case history
- Prior: Court of Appeals refused to enforce the NLRB's orders, 136 F.2d 608 (reversed).

Holding
- Reviewing courts have limited review over administrative agencies' interpretation of terms in their organic statutes. The NLRB's finding that the newsboys were employees was subject to deference.

Court membership
- Chief Justice Harlan F. Stone Associate Justices Owen Roberts · Hugo Black; Stanley F. Reed · Felix Frankfurter; William O. Douglas · Frank Murphy; Robert H. Jackson · Wiley B. Rutledge

Case opinions
- Majority: Rutledge, joined by Stone, Black, Frankfurter, Douglas, Murphy, Jackson
- Concurrence: Reed
- Dissent: Roberts

Laws applied
- National Labor Relations Act

NLRB v. Hearst Publications, 322 U.S. 111 (1944), was an administrative law case heard before the United States Supreme Court. The case concerned the meaning of the term "employees" in the National Labor Relations Act (NLRA).

== Background ==
Hearst Publications (Hearst), the publishers of four daily Los Angeles newspapers, refused to bargain collectively with their newsboys. The newsboys filed petitions with the National Labor Relations Board (NLRB) for certification as a local union. The NLRB found that the newsboys were full-time employees within the meaning of the NLRA and ordered Hearst bargain with the newsboys. The United States Court of Appeals for the Ninth Circuit refused to enforce the order, reasoning that the newsboys were independent contractors, rather than employees.

== Decision of the Court ==
Justice Rutledge, delivering the opinion of the court, ruled that the NLRB's interpretation of the Act was not erroneous. The court held that when an administrative agency engages in "specific application of a broad statutory term in a proceeding in which the agency administering the statute must determine it initially, the reviewing court's function is limited." The newsboys were employees within the meaning of the Act, with whom Hearst was required to collectively bargain.

=== Dissent ===
Justice Roberts, dissenting, wrote that "the question of who is an employee, so as to make the statute applicable to him, is a question of the meaning of the Act and, therefore, is a judicial and not an administrative question."

== Facts ==
Newsboys, who distributed papers on the streets of the city of Los Angeles, formed a union to collectively bargain over wages. They claimed they were 'employees' under the National Labor Relations Act 1935. They alleged their employers were Hearst Publications Inc, which owned the Los Angeles Examiner and the Los Angeles Evening Herald and Express, as well as the Los Angeles Times. The National Labor Relations Board determined that the newsboys were employees, as they worked continuously, regularly and relied on their earnings to support themselves and their families. The publishers dictated the buying and selling prices, fixed their markets, controlled their supply of papers, supervised their work hours and effort, and gave them sales equipment for the publishers' benefit. The NLRB then designated the full-time newsboys and 'checkmen' to be a bargaining unit within the city, excluding temporary, casual and part-time newsboys and bootjackers. The newspapers argued that under common law standards, their control over the newsboys made them no more than independent contractors, so that they were not 'employees' and had no duty to bargain in good faith under the National Labor Relations Act 1935.

== Judgment ==
The Supreme Court held that the Act's history, context and purposes should be taken into account when determining whether someone is an employee, not just common law standards, local law or legal classifications made for other purposes. The NLRB's determination that someone is an employee may not be set aside if it has a reasonable legal basis. Its identification of bargaining units was within its discretion, including its exclusion of suburban newsboys on the ground that they were not in the union.

Rutledge J gave the court's judgment.

Reed J concurred, and said the NLRB had the definition of 'employee' correct.

Roberts J dissented, stating his view that the newsboys were not employees.

== See also ==
- Newsboys Strike of 1899
- List of United States Supreme Court cases, volume 322
- US labor law
