= Marshall v. Holmes =

1891 U.S. Supreme Court case

- Supreme Court of the United States

Argued April 6–7, 1891 Decided November 9, 1891
- Full case name: Marshall v. Holmes et al
- Citations: 141 U.S. 589 (more) 12 S. Ct. 62, 35 L. Ed. 870

Case history
- Prior: 13 La.Ann. 313 (La., 1887)

Holding
- Federal courts have jurisdiction to hear actions for equitable relief from judgements in state court where there is diversity; individual judgements in multiple cases tried singly can be heard in federal court when their aggregate meets the federal amount in controversy even where none of them do by themselves, and courts may set aside or vacate judgements obtained by intrinsic fraud if letting the result stand would be unconscionable. Eighth District of Louisiana reversed

Court membership
- Chief Justice Melville Fuller Associate Justices Stephen J. Field · Joseph P. Bradley; John M. Harlan · Horace Gray; Samuel Blatchford · Lucius Q. C. Lamar II; David J. Brewer · Henry B. Brown

Case opinion
- Majority: Harlan, joined by unanimous

Laws applied
- Common law of civil procedure

Marshall v. Holmes, 141 U.S. 589, is an 1891 decision of the United States Supreme Court on equitable relief, res judicata and fraud on the court in diversity jurisdiction. Justice John Marshall Harlan wrote for a unanimous Court that held it unconscionable to allow a state court's decision to stand that had been based on documents later exposed as forgeries. It permitted a federal case seeking to set that verdict aside to go forward.

The petitioner had previously had several judgements rendered against her in Louisiana state court. After discovering that a letter attributed to her, used as evidence against her at trial, had been forged, she filed a petition for a bill of review in the Southern District of New York seeking to enjoin the respondent from endorsing the verdict. The state court would not allow the case to be removed, and so Marshall appealed directly to the Supreme Court.

Harlan's opinion considered both the question of whether federal courts had the authority to so disturb a state court's decision, and whether a court other than that which rendered the original judgement could grant equitable relief in a decided action where allegedly fraudulent evidence had been considered. He held that since Marshall had sought an independent action, Louisiana law and federal precedent allowed the case to be considered. Harlan also dismissed the respondents' argument that federal courts could not hear the case since none of the judgements against Marshall exceeded the $500 minimum then legally required by noting that they well exceeded that amount in the aggregate.

Other courts noted shortly afterwards that the invocation of unconscionability seemed to be in conflict with the Court's unanimous holding 13 years earlier in United States v. Throckmorton that equitable relief could not be granted in cases of intrinsic fraud such as that Marshall alleged. The Court was asked several years later in Graver v. Faurot to reconcile the two cases, but declined. As of the early 21st century this issue remains unresolved; some state courts and the Third Circuit Court of Appeals have held that Marshall overruled Throckmorton while others have reaffirmed the latter case.

== Underlying dispute ==
In 1884 David Mayer, an agricultural supplier, brought suit against Sarah Marshall, owner of the Cabin Teele cotton plantation in Madison Parish, Louisiana, and 24 of her tenants, alleging nonpayment for products advanced to them. Mayer sought recompense from Marshall in the form of raw cotton equivalent in market value to the money he was owed. The two parties agreed to try all the cases as one.

At trial, Mayer introduced into evidence a letter from Marshall, who was not present, to her late agent, Elijah Boyd, instructing him to release the cotton to Mayer as payment. On that basis he secured judgement against her in all the cases, all for amounts less than $500 each. Marshall learned of the forged letter later but the state Supreme Court declined the case in 1887 as the amount in controversy in each judgement was too small for it to assert jurisdiction.

Marshall returned to her home in New York and filed an action at equity in the Southern District of New York seeking to enjoin Holmes, the Madison Parish sheriff, and Mayer from enforcing or collecting the judgement since it had been obtained fraudulently. Back in Louisiana she applied in state court for removal to federal court. The district court declined, on the grounds that Marshall's petition had been too vague or insufficient to state a case for removal, and she petitioned the U.S. Supreme Court for certiorari.

== Supreme Court ==
The Court granted the petition, and heard oral argument in the case in April 1891. It returned a decision that November holding unanimously for Marshall.

Justice John Marshall Harlan wrote the opinion. Unlike the Louisiana Supreme Court, he found that the Court could hear the case on the basis of the aggregate total of the judgements since they were far above the $500 minimum at the time:

As all the cases not tried went to judgment in accordance with the result in the one tried, as the property of Mrs. Marshall was liable to be taken in execution on all the judgments, as the judgments were held in the same right, and as their validity depended upon the same facts, she was entitled, in order to avoid a multiplicity of actions, and to protect herself against the vexation and cost that would come from numerous executions and levies, to bring one suit for a decree finally determining the matter in dispute in all the cases; and as, under the rules of equity obtaining in the courts of the United States, such a suit could be brought, the aggregate amount of all the judgments against which she sought protection upon grounds common to all the actions is to be deemed, under the act of Congress, the value of the matter here in dispute.

Next Harlan turned to the fraud claim. Since the forged letter had made the difference at trial, "The case ... is one where, without negligence, laches or other fault upon the part of petitioner, Mayer has fraudulently obtained judgments which he seeks, against conscience, to enforce by execution." While it was generally a rule that courts of equity would not reconsider judgements made at law procured by forged or perjured evidence when that evidence had already been considered at trial, Harlan quoted from the Court's 1813 Marine Insurance Co. v. Hodgson decision, which held that "any fact which clearly proves it to be against conscience to execute a judgment, and of which the injured party could not have availed himself in a Court of law; or of which he might have availed himself at law, but was prevented by fraud or accident unmixed with any fault or negligence in himself or his agents, will justify an application to a Court of Chancery."

Lastly Harlan addressed the respondents' argument that there was no federal jurisdiction. Two earlier cases of the Supreme Court where litigants had sought to reopen decided cases because of fraud or other irregularity, Barrow v. Hunton, another case from Louisiana, and Gaines v. Fuentes, controlled. In the former the Court had directed removal to state court; in the latter it did not, finding the case to be an independent action from the original one. "In the one class, there would be a mere revision of errors and irregularities, or of the legality and correctness of the judgments and decrees of the state courts; and in the other class, the investigation of a new case, arising upon new facts

A more recent case, Arrowsmith v. Gleason, decided the issue for Harlan since it had involved, like the instant case, diversity jurisdiction, where citizens of different states are involved, and where the Constitution generally guarantees access to federal courts. "These authorities would seem to place beyond question the jurisdiction of the Circuit Court to take cognizance of the present suit, which is none the less an original, independent suit, because it relates to judgments obtained in the court of another jurisdiction."

The respondents argued that two other recent cases the Court had heard, Nougué v. Clapp and Graham v. Boston, Hartford and Erie Railroad, where the Court had held the cases belonged in state court where fraud had been alleged to have corrupted the original proceedings, weighed in favor of their position. Harlan distinguished those cases as having involved fraud that the petitioners knew of, or reasonably should have, during the original litigation. "... [I]t might be," he wrote, "that relief could be granted by reason of the fact, distinctly alleged, that some of the necessary proof establishing the forgery of the letter was discovered after the judgments at law were rendered, and after the legal delays within which new trials could have been obtained, and could not have been discovered by her sooner."

== Subsequent jurisprudence ==
Among the precedents Harlan's opinion cited was United States v. Throckmorton, an 1878 case in which a similarly unanimous court, including him, had declined to allow the government to reopen a 20-year-old California land claim allegedly secured through falsified documents and perjured affidavits. Justice Samuel Freeman Miller's opinion had drawn on the decisions of English courts dating to 1702 to delineate a distinction between intrinsic fraud, consisting of evidence heard during the original proceeding and considered non-reviewable, and extrinsic fraud, occurrences outside the proceeding that prevented the losing party from fully and fairly presenting their case, which could lead to equitable relief. The fraud in Marshall seemed to be intrinsic, yet the Court had granted her the possibility of relief anyway, a seeming conflict with the earlier decision. The Court declined to do when given the opportunity, but that has not precluded lower courts from considering the issue.

=== Supreme Court ===
==== Graver v. Faurot ====
As Marshall was working its way through the appellate courts, an Illinois man named Graver was solicited by an Ohio banker acquaintance, Faurot, to invest in a company he recommended. Graver decided to buy $15,000 of its stock at what he had been led to believe was a discounted price. In actuality the stock was almost worthless, and Faurot had not disclosed to Graver that he had an interest, nor that he and the company owner, Bailey, had made a written agreement to divide Faurot's investment between themselves.

After the stock collapsed, Graver, suspecting the scheme but having no proof, sued Faurot and Bailey for fraud. Graver's attorney asked the two under oath in depositions if they had so conspired, and they both denied it. Without any other evidence, Graver had no case, and with his agreement the judge dismissed it.

Three years later, Faurot's bank failed. Records filed during the bankruptcy, including documentation on file with the federal government earlier, revealed Faurot's interest and his agreement with Bailey. Graver filed a bill of review in federal court for the Northern District of Illinois seeking to have the earlier dismissal set aside. Judge James Graham Jenkins agreed that Graver had been defrauded, but after reading Throckmorton and Marshall could not decide whether Graver could retry the case with the newly discovered evidence:

I am unable to distinguish those two cases upon the facts. The nature of the fraud was the same in both cases. In both the fraud was in the use of forged documents and false evidence offered by the successful party. In the one case the bill was dismissed, and in the other sustained. Both decisions were by a unanimous court. Three of the justices who were members of the court when the former case was decided were members of the court when the latter case was decided, including the justice who delivered the opinion of the court. I do not see how both can stand, and yet the former case is approvingly referred to in the latter. Possibly the fault is mine, that I am unable to distinguish them. In the doubtful frame of mind in which I am left: by these two apparently conflicting decisions, I might have recourse to the maxim that the greater regard should be given to the latter decision, were it not for the fact that in the latter case the former decision is approvingly referred to, and apparently sought to be followed.

Jenkins chose to resolve that question by procedurally ruling for the defendants and suggesting the problem might be resolved on appeal.

The Seventh Circuit Court of Appeals decided to certify the question to the Supreme Court before attempting to decide the case. In 1896 the Court unanimously declined. As part of the record, the Seventh Circuit had submitted the entire case, which, Chief Justice Melville Fuller wrote, put the Supreme Court in a difficult position. Statute forbid the appellate circuits from submitting an entire case to the Court without a specific question or questions to resolve.

"[I]f we should find that the bill was insufficient when tested by principles accepted in both the cases referred to, we should be indisposed to return an answer not required for the disposition of the case," Fuller observed. "This practically requires us to pass upon the whole case as it stands, and to decide whether the demurrer was properly sustained or not." Thus, he said, the Court would not consider the question unless the whole case was appealed to it.

On remand, the Seventh Circuit issued its decision, holding provisionally for Graver, later that year. Judge William Allen Woods wrote for a unanimous three-judge panel that carefully considered the distinction drawn in the two cases. "[M]anifestly it is not true of a complainant in equity that when he brings his bill he must come prepared with proof to maintain it, and to meet any defense which may be interposed", he wrote. "It is his privilege to search the conscience of his adversary by requiring, him to answer under oath, and if possessed of no other evidence, or means of obtaining it, he must accept or at least yield to the answer as true."

Because of the false testimony the case could not go to trial, bringing it under Throckmorton's exception for extrinsic fraud. "The present case does not come within the strict letter, and certainly not within the spirit or reason, of the rule", Woods wrote. Ultimately, Woods concluded, it was not necessary to reconcile the two cases; in fact both of them justified holding for Graver. "There can be and ought to be no repose of society where for such wrongs the courts are incapable of giving redress."

==== Simon v. Southern Railway Co. ====
The petitioner in Simon v. Southern Railway Co. had obtained a judgement in Louisiana state court against the respondent, a Virginia company, for injuries allegedly suffered in a train accident with fraudulent evidence but without notice to them of the proceedings. After defying an earlier order not to enforce the judgement, he had been jailed for contempt of court, and then filed a habeas petition with the Supreme Court arguing that the Fifth Circuit, as a federal court, no authority over his case and thus no authority for him to be in contempt of. The petition was denied, with the Court citing Marshall to support the federal jurisdiction.

The Supreme Court appointed a special master to review the entire case and report on the law and the facts. He found that the circuit court had jurisdiction. Simon appealed to the Fifth Circuit, which affirmed the master, and then petitioned the Court for certiorari.

Justice Joseph Rucker Lamar wrote for another unanimous Court that affirmed the Fifth Circuit. Simon had relied on Marshall, distinguishing it from his case as not having involved an existing injunction. Lamar disagreed: "...[I]f a United States court can enjoin a plaintiff from using a judgment, proved to be fraudulent, it can likewise enjoin him from using a judgment absolutely void for want of service." Simon had also argued Marshall was different as it had involved removal, but Lamar saw that as immaterial since it was not the basis of the case.

==== United States v. Beggerly ====
In the 1998 case United States v. Beggerly, the federal government appealed the Fifth Circuit's holding in favor of a family who, after having learned that records in the National Archives showed an ancestor of theirs had received a grant of part of Mississippi's Horn Island from the Spanish governor of Louisiana, sued to set aside the quiet title proceedings by which Gulf Islands National Seashore had been created. Their ancestor's claim had predated the Louisiana Purchase so it could not have been among lands transferred by the French government to the United States in 1803. The 12-year statute of limitations on the title proceedings had by then expired, and the Southern District of Mississippi accordingly dismissed their petition.

On appeal, the Fifth Circuit reversed, finding the statute subject to equitable tolling in this case. The government appealed to the Supreme Court, which reversed. Chief Justice William Rehnquist wrote for a unanimous court.

The Beggerlys had cited Marshall to argue that the government's action was so unconscionable as to justify reopening the title case. Rehnquist distinguished the two cases, noting that while Marshall had alleged intentional fraud by the opposing party, the Beggerlys were only alleging that the government had been negligent in searching records within its possession. "It surely would work no 'grave miscarriage of justice,' and perhaps no miscarriage of justice at all, to allow the judgment to stand."

=== Federal appeals courts ===
==== United States v. Gleeson ====
Three years after Marshall, in United States v. Gleeson, the Second Circuit rejected the idea that it had in any way overruled Throckmorton. In denying a motion to vacate a naturalization obtained through alleged misrepresentation, Judge Emile Henry Lacombe noted that in another recent case which turned on the same issue, after the circuit had cited Throckmorton without writing an opinion to uphold the district court's denial of review, the appellant twice petitioned the Supreme Court for certiorari, both times with briefs citing the unresolved issues between the two cases, and was denied both times. "Until the attention of this court is called to some decision of the Supreme Court," Lacombe wrote, "other than Holmes v. Marshall, criticising or limiting the doctrine of U.S. v. Throckmorton, it would seem that the principle of stare decisis should preclude its entertaining a bill which seeks to vacate or annul a judgment solely on the ground that such judgment was procured by means of the perjured testimony of the party whom it benefits." (Note: Judge William James Wallace dissented, but did not write an opinion explaining why.)

==== American Bakeries Co. v. Vining ====
In American Bakeries Co. v. Vining, Judge Halsted L. Ritter of the Southern District of Florida was asked in 1935 by the petitioner to set aside a state court verdict in favor of the respondent over injuries suffered in a motor vehicle accident, where one witness admitted to having perjured themselves and others were suspected of doing so. It had already unsuccessfully appealed as far as the Florida Supreme Court. The company cited Marshall while the respondents pointed to Throckmorton.

Since Graver had left the apparent overlap between the two cases unresolved, Ritter decided on Throckmorton as the more controlling precedent, since its general rule was also quoted in Marshall. On appeal, the Fifth Circuit affirmed the ruling. It distinguished the instant case from Marshall by pointing out that in that case the claim had been wholly manufactured by the fraud involved, instead of an undeniable injury whose severity had been artificially magnified by perjured testimony.

==== Publicker v. Shallcross ====
The Third Circuit had entirely the opposite take on Marshall when it heard Publicker v. Shallcross in 1939. The petitioner appealed a judgement against him that had vacated a finding during a foreclosure proceeding two years prior where he had represented himself as nearly destitute to pay off the balance of the defaulted mortgage; his friends covered it at a penny on the dollar. It was later discovered that his actual financial condition was sufficient to have sustained a much higher repayment.

The circuit had initially remanded with the goal of a full trial on the facts as well as the law, but Publicker retained new counsel that sought to try the matter purely on Throckmorton as a test case. In briefs they called the facts immaterial, thereby to the court confessing the fraud. "Appellant's position seems to be that, in his circumstance, wickedness, as well as virtue, is its own reward", wrote Judge William Clark. Publicker's brief relied heavily on Throckmorton, but "[w]e do not consider ourselves bound by that case for two, as we think, excellent reasons. We do not believe it applies to our circumstance and we do not believe it is the law of the Supreme Court today."

Clark looked instead to Marshall, "a source of bewilderment" to lower courts since 1891, which Publicker's attorney had apparently been unaware of. He again quoted at length a Columbia Law Review article taking note of the "hazy region of uncertainty" between Throckmorton and Marshall, saying that as long as courts are free to pick and choose between them, "there will be no federal rule at all." Calling Marshall the "more salutary" of the two, Clark wrote for himself and his colleagues that the district court would be upheld as "[w]e believe truth is more important than the trouble it takes to get it."

Publicker petitioned the Supreme Court to hear the case, but it denied certiorari.

===== Averbach v. Rival Manufacturing Co. =====
A half-century after Publicker, the Third Circuit reaffirmed its rejection of Throckmorton in favor of Marshall. Averbach v. Rival Manufacturing Co. was a product liability action where, after a previous jury verdict for the defendant, the plaintiff had learned of far more extensive reports of the can opener at issue starting fires due to a faultily designed switch on file with the Consumer Product Safety Commission than the company had disclosed during trial. John Joseph Gibbons, the circuit's chief judge, held that Throckmorton "was overruled, if it ever was the law," by Marshall; he also cited Erie doctrine case law as having eliminated the federal substantive law of equitable remedies.

==== Josserand v. Taylor ====
In 1944, the Supreme Court revisited the intrinsic-extrinsic fraud distinction it had created in Throckmorton with Hazel-Atlas Glass Co. v. Hartford-Empire Co., a patent infringement case where it had been discovered some years later that an apparently impartial journal article used by respondent during its successful appeal had in fact been written by its own lawyers for another person to sign. A divided Court had held that while the fraud may have met Throckmorton's definition of intrinsic fraud and thus been unreviewable, the fact that it had been performed by officers of the court demanded that an exception be made. Since Justice Hugo Black's majority opinion had twice cited Marshall, commentators wondered if the Court was signaling that that case, not Throckmorton, now controlled.

Two years after Hazel-Atlas, the now-defunct Court of Customs and Patent Appeals(CCPA) (Note: Its jurisdiction is now part of the Federal Circuit Court of Appeals, created to replace the CCPA and other narrow-jurisdiction courts in 1982.) took that question up in Josserand v. Taylor. The respondent alleged that perjured testimony on behalf of the petitioner at an earlier interference proceeding had tainted the result, and argued that Hazel-Atlas had made Marshall controlling. Judge Charles Sherrod Hatfield wrote for a panel that held to the contrary.

Admitting that the way the Supreme Court had handled its authorities in Hazel-Atlas had caused "some confusion", Hatfield did not feel that himself. "It would seem to be clear that if the majority of the Supreme Court, in the Hazel-Atlas Glass Co. case," he wrote, "had been of opinion that the fraud there held to have been perpetrated was intrinsic, and that there was a conflict between the decision in the Marshall v. Holmes and United States v. Throckmorton cases, supra, particularly in view of the circumstances hereinbefore related, it would have said so and would have expressly repudiated the rule announced in the Throckmorton case and followed by the Supreme Court and the Circuit Courts of Appeals in the cases hereinbefore cited." He noted that many cases since Marshall had also relied on Throckmorton without any apparent concern from the Court.

=== In re de Manati ===
In 1972 Judge José Victor Toledo of the District of Puerto Rico weighed in on the relationship between Throckmorton and Marshall when considering In re de Manati, a bankruptcy case where a debtor sought to have a local court's judgement overturned on the grounds it was obtained through misrepresentation of interest by a creditor. The debtor had urged the court to rely on Marshall, but Toledo wrote that it "seems not to have gone as far as the debtor believes", since it only applied to situations where no relief was available at law, which de Manati could have gotten in local court. He also believed that Marshall was only applicable in situations where removal was an issue, "which circumstance may have justified Mr. Justice Harlan's language and his overpassing Throckmorton sub silentio".

=== State courts ===
Many state supreme courts have followed Throckmorton without separately considering the impact of Marshall, or even taking note of it. Wisconsin and New Jersey have, after taking both cases into consideration, agreed with the Third Circuit that the latter case effectively overrules the former.

==== Boring v. Ott ====
The Wisconsin Supreme Court considered Boring v. Ott in 1909, in which the petitioner, executor of an estate, alleged that the respondent had 10 years prior misrepresented a contract between himself and the decedent as in force at the time of his death in order to claim a share of a business the latter owned. Justice James C. Kerwin wrote for a majority of six that while Throckmorton''s rule was generally a good one, it was problematic for lower courts in that it did not define extrinsic fraud clearly enough, and even if it had it left issues unresolved. "[I]t is not easy to see why an issue determined solely by the perjury of the prevailing party does not amount to such a fraud, where such perjury was unknown to the defeated party, and could not by the exercise of reasonable diligence have been discovered," he wrote. "It would seem that a judgement thus obtained is as unconscionable as one secured by keeping a party away from court or by other corrupt means, and thereby preventing a fair trial on the merits." Therefore he found Marshall's unconscionability exception to better serve the interests of justice.

While the court ultimately denied relief on factual grounds, dissenting justice Roujet D. Marshall said it need not have gone that far as Throckmorton was sufficiently controlling. Marshall, he wrote, "bears all the earmarks of having been decided without full appreciation of the situation the [C]ourt had created." If the Court had considered Throckmorton at all, Justice Marshall speculated, it was to decide that the use of forged documents was extrinsic fraud and thus fit for relief. In support of that proposition, Marshall argued that "in many cases decided since 1891 ... the Throckmorton rule is found vindicated in all its integrity."

==== Shammas v. Shammas ====
Justice William Brennan, later appointed to the Supreme Court, wrote for a New Jersey Supreme Court that opted to follow Marshall rather than Throckmorton in 1952's Shammas v. Shammas. A divorcée challenged her divorce settlement on the grounds that at trial her former husband, while his suit against her for abandonment was pending, had denied any bigamy when in fact he had not only abandoned her but returned to his native Syria to marry a woman (by then deceased) and live with her there for several years. "Perjurious testimony alone and not accompanied or concealed by other and collateral acts of fraud may be a ground for relief as a fraud upon the court in a proper case", Brennan wrote. He was unsure whether Marshall had, as Publicker claimed, overruled Throckmorton, since Hazel-Atlas had cited them both without addressing the issue and federal courts continued to follow Throckmorton as well. (Note: Three decades later, the Utah Supreme Court, in another divorce case, similarly decided to prefer Marshall over Throckmorton without expressing an opinion as to which controlled.)

==== Schwartz v. Merchants Mortgage Co. ====
At the turn of the century, Maryland's highest court, its Court of Appeals, accepted Throckmorton as precedent in Maryland Steel Co. v. Marney. Three-quarters of a century later, in Schwartz v. Merchants Mortgage Co., the petitioners, alleging a conspiracy to deceive the trial court among the respondents, asked the court to re-evaluate the 1900 holding in light of Marshall. Judge J. Dudley Digges wrote for a court that unanimously rejected the idea:

The law of Maryland is too well settled for us to overrule it in a decision such as this. Whether Marshall modified Throckmorton is irrelevant here, since even if it did, all of the decisions of this Court [since then] have consistently adopted Throckmorton as correctly expressing the law of this state with no mention of Marshall at all. Surely, our predecessors were aware of that case but chose to ignore it.
