= Graver v. Faurot =

1896 U.S. court case decided by Seventh Circuit after Supreme Court denied cert

- Supreme Court of the United States

Decided April 13, 1896
- Full case name: Graver v. Faurot
- Citations: 162 U.S. 435 (more) 16 S.Ct. 799, 40 L.Ed. 1030

Case history
- Prior: 64 F. 241 (N.D.Ill., 1891)
- Subsequent: 76 F. 257 (7th Cir., 1896)

Holding
- Since statute bars the Court from considering entire cases on appeal where no federal question is presented for certification, the Court cannot accept a question seeking to resolve a conflict between earlier decisions where the entire record is included as that entails deciding the case without being asked to do so. Certiorari denied.

Court membership
- Chief Justice Melville Fuller Associate Justices Stephen J. Field · John M. Harlan; Horace Gray · David J. Brewer; Henry B. Brown · George Shiras Jr. Edward D. White · Rufus W. Peckham

Case opinion
- Majority: Fuller, joined by unanimous

Laws applied
- Judiciary Act of 1891

Graver v. Faurot, (162 U.S. 435), is a case decided in 1896 by the United States Court of Appeals for the Seventh Circuit on the issues of res judicata and fraud on the court. The Seventh Circuit had heard the case the preceding year but, like the district court that had previously heard it, was unable to decide which of two recent U.S. Supreme Court cases was controlling. After the Supreme Court denied certiorari to resolve the issue, on procedural grounds, the Seventh Circuit resolved the case itself.

The case had arisen from an 1889 investment made by Graver in a company recommended by Faurot, a banker he was acquainted with. Represented to Graver as promising, the company was actually worthless. After learning this, he suspected Faurot and the company's owner, Bailey, of having concealed the company's true condition from him and sued the two in federal court for securities fraud. Both defendants denied any scheme when questioned under oath, and Graver and the two agreed to dismiss the case. Three years later, when Faurot's bank failed, documents introduced in the bankruptcy proceedings and on file with the federal government revealed not only that both he and Bailey knew the stock's true value but that Faurot had had an interest in the company and had concluded an agreement with Bailey to divide the proceeds of Graver's purchase between them. Graver filed a new action in federal court seeking, as equitable relief, to have the previous dismissal set aside since it had been obtained through perjured testimony.

Two recent decisions of the Supreme Court, United States v. Throckmorton and Marshall v. Holmes, addressed the relevant question of whether Graver could reopen the suit, but with contrary interpretations. The district judge said that while the facts of the case showed that Graver had been defrauded he could not distinguish the two cases, and certified the case to the Seventh Circuit, which in turn sought guidance from the Supreme Court. In a unanimous opinion written by Chief Justice Melville Fuller, the Court denied certiorari, on the grounds that the appellate court had effectively certified the entire case to it, which the Judiciary Act of 1891 forbade them from accepting without a federal question to decide. Even though there was such a question, the Court preferred not to answer it without deciding a case whose facts might dictate a contrary conclusion. So later that year the Seventh Circuit held for Graver that the perjury constituted extrinsic fraud which had prevented him from having his case fairly heard and decided.

Since Graver the Supreme Court has considered some other cases where the factual question of whether a litigant's deception and misbehavior has constituted intrinsic fraud which under Throckmorton cannot be used as a basis for relief, cases in which observers hoped it would resolve the conflict they saw with Marshall, which suggested a court could grant relief from a prior judgement allegedly obtained by fraud if it was unconscionable not to. It has never reconsidered the question offered in Graver of which case controls. Lower federal, and state, courts that have done so have pointed to Graver as the reason they felt compelled to.

== Background ==
Courts of equity, empowered to give orders as relief rather than award monetary judgements as courts of law do, in England and later the U.S., had long dealt with cases where unsuccessful litigants seeking to negate a judgement against them at law had come before alleged perjury or forgery by the other party during the original action, often supported by just the testimony of one witness. Since hearing these cases could easily ensure that the litigation continued for years, courts began requiring minimum standards to hear them. "New matter may in some cases be ground for relief," wrote Lord Keeper Nathan Wright in Tovey v. Young, a 1702 English case, "but it must not be what was tried before; nor, when it consists in swearing only, will I ever grant a new trial, unless it appears by deeds, or writing, or that a witness on whose testimony the verdict was given was convicted of perjury, or the jury attainted."

In 1813 the U.S. Supreme Court decided Marine Insurance Co. v. Hodgson, a case where the petitioner appealed a federal court's finding in favor of the respondent, who they alleged had submitted documentation that overstated the value of a ship and her cargo, leading the insurer to pay out a much larger claim than it should properly have. Chief Justice John Marshall wrote for a unanimous Court that while a court of equity could consider an application for relief where a litigant alleged unconscionable conduct on an opposing party's part, "[o]n the other hand it may with equal safety be laid down as a general rule that a defence cannot be set up in equity which has been fully and fairly tried at law, although it may be the opinion of that Court that the defence ought to have been sustained at law." Since the insurer had decided to accept a certificate of the vessel's value from its captain even though Hodgson would not vouch for its accuracy, the Court held that they had lost their opportunity to make a case for fraud and seek an injunction against enforcement of the judgement against them.

=== United States v. Throckmorton ===
In 1878 the Supreme Court heard United States v. Throckmorton, in which the federal government appealed a California lower court decision that left undisturbed the government's acceptance of a settler's 1830s Mexican land claim two decades earlier. The government had later learned that a document filed with the claim had been falsely backdated and affidavits attesting to the document being signed on the supposed date were in fact perjured. It unanimously affirmed the lower court.

Justice Samuel Freeman Miller balanced two principles in his opinion. On the one hand, while he agreed that "there is no question of the general doctrine that fraud vitiates the most solemn contracts, documents, and even judgments", it became more difficult to prove a past fraud over time. It was also equally important that, per the legal Latin maxim interest rei publicae, ut sit finis litium, litigation not be allowed to continue indefinitely and that no one be punished or tried twice for the same offense.

Miller thus distinguished two types of fraud on the court for purposes of deciding whether equitable relief could be granted, if the fraud were proven, where the case was otherwise beyond reopening. Fraud such as that in the instant case, which "was founded on a fraudulent instrument, or perjured evidence, or for any matter which was actually presented and considered in the judgment assailed" (subsequently called intrinsic fraud) would not be eligible for relief. But in cases where the fraud was "extrinsic", where it never touched any of the evidence presented at trial, or where "there has never been a real contest in the trial or hearing of the case" because the fraud prevented the injured party from making a full and fair presentation, then courts could grant relief, Miller wrote.

=== Marshall v. Holmes ===
Thirteen years after Throckmorton, the Court heard Marshall v. Holmes, another case where past fraud on the court had been uncovered and the defeated litigant sought equitable relief from the judgement. In 1887, petitioner Sarah Marshall, a New York woman who owned a large Louisiana plantation, had been sued in state court by Mayer, a supplier, along with her tenants for nonpayment. Since all the cases Mayer brought presented the same issues, the parties agreed to save time and money by trying them singly. According to a document purportedly signed by Marshall that Mayer presented at trial in her absence, their defaults entitled him to payment apportioned between cash and raw cotton at the equivalent market value; based on this, the court held in his favor.

With an appeal pending, Marshall saw the document Mayer claimed she had signed for the first time and recognized it as a forgery. The Louisiana Supreme Court declined to hear the appeal on the grounds that none of the cases presented a large enough amount in controversy and the law did not allow it to aggregate the cases. Marshall then sought equitable relief from the original judgement in federal court for the Southern District of New York, but the Louisiana state court refused to follow the removal order, so she appealed to the Supreme Court.

Again the Court was unanimous. After establishing that Marshall's case was properly before a federal court in diversity jurisdiction, and that the aggregate value of the judgement was enough to justify a federal case, Justice John Marshall Harlan's opinion considered whether she was entitled to relief. Observing that, in the instant case, "the judgments in question would not have been rendered against Mrs. Marshall but for the use in evidence of the letter alleged to be forged", he found the case to be among those that Hodgson allowed courts to grant relief in, quoting from that decision at some length. Harlan appended to the quotation other cases that supported the finding, including Throckmorton and later distinguished the case further from two the respondents had relied on, on the grounds that in those cases the party seeking relief could have found evidence of the fraud at trial, whereas Marshall had not known of the forged letter until after the trial.

== Underlying dispute ==
In 1889 Graver, an Illinois man who had been enticed by Faurot, an Ohio banker he had deposited money with, to buy stock at an apparent discount; it was actually worthless. He came to believe his banker had an interest in the company and had thus benefited materially from the fraudulent sale, and filed suit in state court. Before trial, Graver deposed both Faurot and Bailey, the company owner, asking them both under oath about details of the alleged scheme. They denied it, and with no evidence of the alleged fraud, the judge dismissed the case.

Three years later, the bank failed, and from records disclosed during the bankruptcy proceedings, including records filed with the federal government two years prior to the transaction, Graver was able to confirm his original suspicions of fraud. Faurot had represented himself as a disinterested party when Graver bought the stock, but he actually had owned a portion of the company, and he and Bailey had made a written agreement to divide the profits from the sale between them. With this evidence in hand, Graver filed suit in federal court for the Northern District of Illinois, seeking equitable relief and a chance to retry the case.

== District court ==
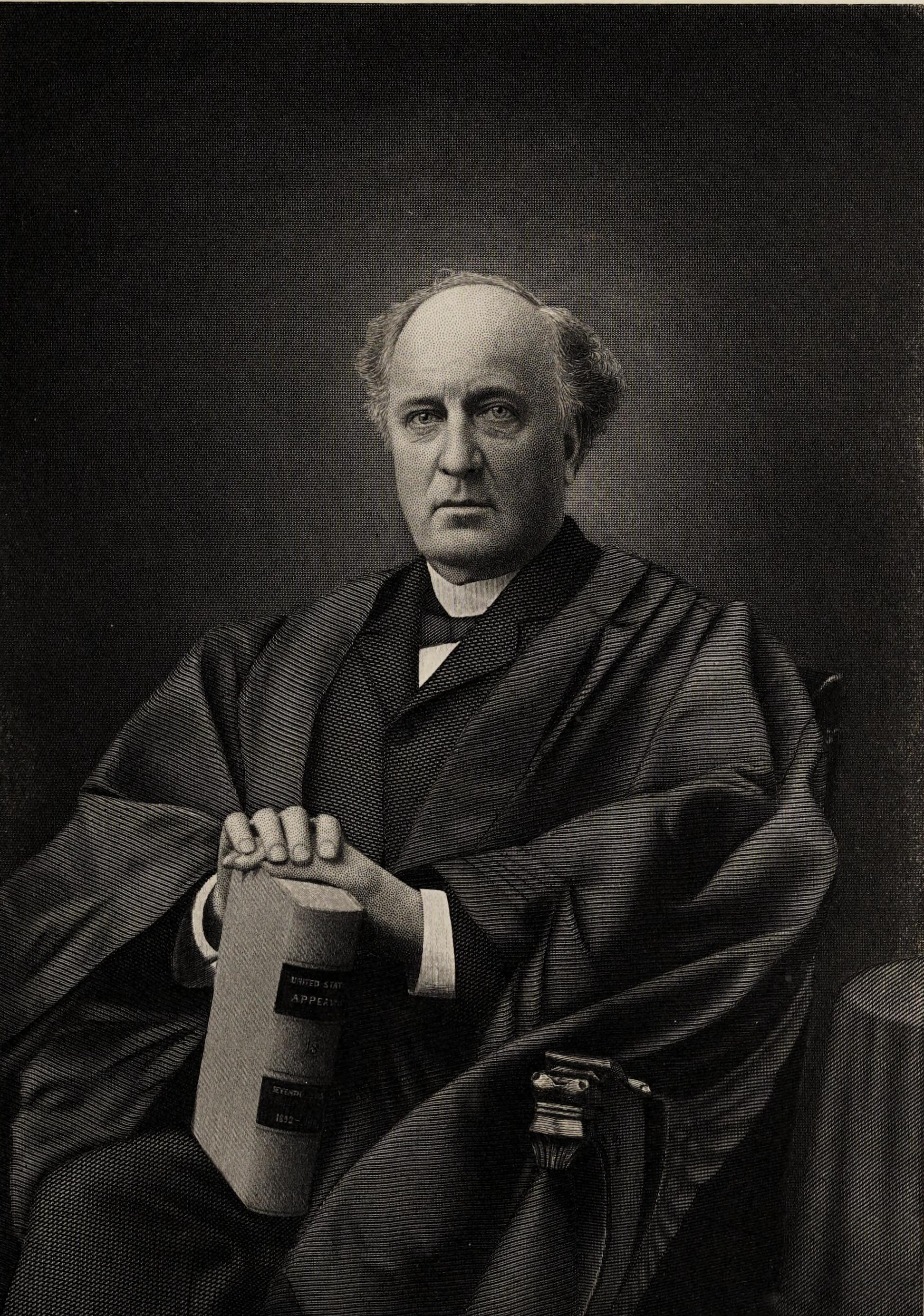
Judge James Graham Jenkins

Judge James Graham Jenkins found Graver's petition to be an original suit that he could consider. "Assuming the facts to be as stated in this bill, I have been impressed with the conviction that the complainant has been grievously defrauded", he wrote in his 1894 decision. But he found himself conflicted between Throckmorton and Marshall as to which case controlled and thus whether he could grant Graver relief:

I am unable to distinguish those two cases upon the facts. The nature of the fraud was the same in both cases. In both the fraud was in the use of forged documents and false evidence offered by the successful party. In the one case the bill was dismissed, and in the other sustained. Both decisions were by a unanimous court. Three of the justices who were members of the court when the former case was decided were members of the court when the latter case was decided, including the justice who delivered the opinion of the court. I do not see how both can stand, and yet the former case is approvingly referred to in the latter. Possibly the fault is mine, that I am unable to distinguish them. In the doubtful frame of mind in which I am left: by these two apparently conflicting decisions, I might have recourse to the maxim that the greater regard should be given to the latter decision, were it not for the fact that in the latter case the former decision is approvingly referred to, and apparently sought to be followed.

Jenkins chose to resolve that question by procedurally ruling for the defendants and suggesting the problem might be resolved on appeal.

== Supreme Court ==
The Seventh Circuit Court of Appeals decided to certify the question to the Supreme Court before attempting to decide the case. In 1896 the Court unanimously declined. As part of the record, the Seventh Circuit had submitted the entire case, which, Chief Justice Melville Fuller wrote, put the Supreme Court in a difficult position. The Judiciary Act of 1891 forbid the appellate circuits from submitting an entire case to the Court without a specific question or questions to resolve. And while that was not technically the case with Graver, as a practical matter it was.

"[I]f we should find that the bill was insufficient when tested by principles accepted in both the cases referred to, we should be indisposed to return an answer not required for the disposition of the case," Fuller observed. "This practically requires us to pass upon the whole case as it stands, and to decide whether the demurrer was properly sustained or not." Thus, he said, the Court would not consider the question unless the whole case was appealed to it.

== Seventh Circuit ==
Graver v. Faurot
- Court: United States Court of Appeals for the Seventh Circuit
- Decided: October 5, 1896
- Citation: 76 F. 257

Case history
- Prior actions: 162 U.S. 435 (1896), cert. den.
- Appealed from: 64 F. 241 (N.D.Ill.

Court membership
- Judges sitting: William Allen Woods, John William Showalter, John Baker

Case opinions
- Respondents' concealment of ownership interest and true condition of investment sold to petitioner, and perjured denial under oath in original lawsuit were both unconscionable and extrinsic fraud; therefore it is not necessary to decide which of two possibly precedential Supreme Court decisions apply. Equitable relief granted
- Decision by: Woods

Keywords
- intrinsic fraud; extrinsic fraud; unconscionability

On remand, the Seventh Circuit issued its decision, holding provisionally for Graver, later that year. Judge William Allen Woods wrote for a unanimous three-judge panel that carefully considered the distinction drawn in the two cases. "[M]anifestly it is not true of a complainant in equity that when he brings his bill he must come prepared with proof to maintain it, and to meet any defense which may be interposed", he wrote. "It is his privilege to search the conscience of his adversary by requiring him to answer under oath, and if possessed of no other evidence, or means of obtaining it, he must accept or at least yield to the answer as true."

In the original case, Graver had strongly suspected the scheme but had no documentary evidence or witnesses other than the two defendants, both of whom swore falsely that there was no deceitful intent, interest or agreement between them. That perjury constituted an original fraud in addition to the one Graver alleged, not only victimizing him but the court as well. Because of the false testimony the case could not go to trial, bringing it under Throckmorton's exception for extrinsic fraud. "The present case does not come within the strict letter, and certainly not within the spirit or reason, of the rule", Woods wrote.

Ultimately, Woods concluded, it was not necessary to reconcile the two cases; in fact both of them justified holding for Graver. "In reason and good conscience a decree obtained as this one is alleged to have been ought to be annulled", he wrote. "There can be no consideration of public policy or of private right on which it ought to stand. There can be and ought to be no repose of society where for such wrongs the courts are incapable of giving redress."

== Subsequent jurisprudence ==
In several cases over the next two decades, the Supreme Court cited Graver when refusing cases from the appellate circuits that were certified in their entirety or with only questions of fact.

In 1909's Boring v. Ott, the Wisconsin Supreme Court decided to follow Marshall rather than Throckmorton. Dissenting justice Roujet D. Marshall noted that Graver was supposed "to settle the matter" but did not. A clear statement from the Court was not necessary; Marshall believed that the Supreme Court's rejection of two later cases that asked it to do the same thing as the Seventh Circuit had in Graver, and its restatement of Throckmorton's rule in Hilton v. Guyot, were to be taken as indications of support for that case from the Supreme Court.

During the 1930s, federal courts seeking resolution of the apparent conflict between Throckmorton and Marshall took note of Graver's refusal to resolve the issue. The Southern District of Florida characterized Graver as a refusal to decide the question in 1935, and four years later, the Third Circuit, quoting that decision, observed that Graver "must have discouraged others". It chose to follow Marshall, holding that "truth is more important than the trouble it takes to get it." The Supreme Court denied certiorari on that case as well.

Around that time, the Federal Rules of Civil Procedure were introduced, with Rule 60(b) allowing a petition for equitable relief regardless of the type of fraud alleged within a year of the judgement to be attacked. Commentators hoped that when Hazel-Atlas Glass Co. v. Hartford-Empire Co., a complex case on the issue, came before the Court in 1944, it would choose between Throckmorton and Marshall. But while citing both cases, Justice Hugo Black's opinion for a narrow majority instead created an exception for fraud committed by officers of the court. State courts in more recent decisions have noted that the issue remains unresolved.
