= Hazel-Atlas Glass Co. v. Hartford-Empire Co. =

- Supreme Court of the United States

Argued February 9–10, 1944 Decided May 15, 1944
- Full case name: Hazel-Atlas Glass Co. v. Hartford-Empire Co.
- Citations: 322 U.S. 238 (more) 64 S. Ct. 997; 88 L. Ed. 1250; 1944 U.S. LEXIS 1200; 61 U.S.P.Q. 241

Case history
- Prior: Hartford-Empire Co. v. Hazel Atlas Glass Co., 39 F.2d 111 (W.D. Pa. 1930); 59 F.2d 399 (3d Cir. 1932); 125 F.2d 976 (3d Cir. 1941); 137 F.2d 764 (3d Cir. 1943).

Holding
- Equitable relief can be granted by any court in decided cases where intrinsic fraud on the court perpetrated by officers of the court was discovered after expiration of term as long as parties apply to circuit court for leave. Third Circuit reversed.

Court membership
- Chief Justice Harlan F. Stone Associate Justices Owen Roberts · Hugo Black; Stanley F. Reed · Felix Frankfurter; William O. Douglas · Frank Murphy; Robert H. Jackson · Wiley B. Rutledge

Case opinions
- Majority: Black, joined by Douglas, Murphy, Jackson, Rutledge
- Dissent: Roberts, joined by Reed, Frankfurter, Stone (in part)

Laws applied
- Common law of civil procedure

Hazel-Atlas Glass Co. v. Hartford-Empire Co., 322 U.S. 238 (1944), is a much cited 1944 decision of the United States Supreme Court dealing with fraud on the Patent Office. A widely quoted statement in the Court's opinion is: "The public welfare demands that the agencies of public justice be not so impotent that they must always be mute and helpless victims of deception and fraud." Although the fraud occurred in the late 1920s, the facts became public only much later in the Government's antitrust trial in United States v. Hartford-Empire Co.

== Background ==
The Hartford gob feeder fraudulently patented in this case (U.S. Pat. No. 1,655,391

In 1926 Hartford had a pending Peiler patent application on a "gob feeder" glass-making machine. The Patent Office confronted Hartford with "apparently insurmountable opposition." To help persuade the Office to grant the application, Hartford's patent attorney R.F. Hatch "ghost-wrote" a trade journal article for a union official, Clarke, praising the invention as a revolutionary advance, and paying him to sign it. Hartford's patent attorneys Brown and Dorsey brought the published article to the attention of the Patent Office. The Office then issued the patent (U.S. Patent No. 1,655,391), in 1928. Hartford then sued Hazel for infringing the patent. The district court dismissed the bill, however, on the ground that no infringement had been proved. The court considered the patent to be at best only a slight improvement in a well-developed art (automatic feeders for mechanical glass bottle blowing), accordingly held that the claims were not entitled to a broad construction and that, with the Peiler patent so construed, Hazel had not infringed.

Hartford appealed to the Third Circuit; its patent attorneys, including the one who "had played a part in getting the spurious article prepared for publication," for the first time focused the court's attention on the article. The court's opinion quoted copiously from the article and reversed the district court, holding the patent valid and infringed. In contrast to the district court, the Third Circuit considered the patent to be a pioneer (as Clarke maintained), so that the claims were entitled to a broad construction. Therefore, with the patent claims so construed, the Third Circuit held that Hazel infringed a valid patent.

During trial in the district court in 1929, Hazel had received hearsay information that both Clarke and one of Hartford's lawyers had, several years previously, admitted that a Hartford lawyer was the true author of the spurious publication. Hazel did not at that time attempt to verify the truth of the hearsay story of the article's authorship, but relied upon other defenses, which proved successful in the district court. After the opinion of the Third Circuit in 1932, quoting the spurious article and reversing the decree of the district court, Hazel hired private investigators for the purpose of verifying the hearsay by admissible evidence. One of the PIs interviewed Clarke twice. In each interview, Clarke insisted that he wrote the article, and would so swear if summoned to court. In the second interview, the investigator asked Clarke to sign a statement telling in detail how the article was prepared, and further asked to see Clarke's files. Clarke replied that he would not "stultify" himself by signing any "statement or affidavit;" and that he would show the records to no one unless compelled by a subpoena. At the same time, he reinforced his claim of authorship by asserting that he had spent seven weeks in preparing the article. Unknown to Hazel, a Hartford representative had gone to visit Clarke. Hazel's PI reported failure, but Hartford's man reported "very successful results," that Hartford was in a "most satisfactory position" in the matter, and that Clarke had signed an affidavit for him stating that Clarke had "signed the article and released it for publication." Hazel then capitulated in the patent infringement litigation and settled with Hartford for $1 million, and the parties entered into a cross-licensing agreement. Hartford's representative then went back to Clarke, who asked for $10,000; they negotiated (Hartford initially said $$10,000 was too much) but Hartford eventually paid him the full $10,000. These facts came out during the Government's Hartford-Empire trial in 1941.

== Renewed Third Circuit review ==
Hazel then filed in the Third Circuit a petition for leave to file a somewhat belated bill of review in the district court to set aside the 1932 judgment which that court entered against Hazel pursuant to the Third Circuit's mandate overturning the district court's judgment of non-infringement. Hazel contended that the Third Circuit's appellate judgment had been obtained by fraud. The Third Circuit decided that because the alleged fraud had been perpetrated on it, rather than on the district court, it should decide the case instead of having the district court consider a bill of review.

The Third Circuit considered the evidence of how Hartford's patent attorneys wrote the article for Clarke, had it published, and then presented it to the Patent Office. It concluded, however, that "sordid as is the story concerning the genesis of the Clarke article and the deceptive design and use of its spurious authorship, still it does not qualify as after-discovered evidence" in Hartford's infringement suit against Hazel. The court pointed to Hazel's knowledge of the hearsay during the trial in 1929. "Although then so informed, counsel for Hazel-Atlas deliberately chose not to go into the matter of the article's real authorship, fearing that if they should refer to the article (which was not in evidence), they might thereby call attention to the statements therein contained as to the increased production from gob feeders as compared with stream feeders, which could not be successfully refuted."

The Third Circuit also emphasized that although the authorship of the article had been falsified, it was not shown that its factual assertions were false. Therefore, the fraud was not "material." Accordingly, "In the situation shown, it is not possible for us to say that the Clarke article was so basic to this court's decision in the Hazel-Atlas case that, upon the showing of fraud in the article's authorship, we would be justified in setting aside the order[]."

The Third Circuit also held that it lacked power to set aside its 1932 of infringement and must dismiss the case:

[This court lost] the only jurisdiction it ever had over the decrees in those cases, appropriate mandates duly issued and the terms at which the final orders on the appeals were entered expired long prior to the filing of the instant petitions without action having been taken to extend this court's grasp. In that situation there is nothing from which the jurisdiction of this court can be deemed to have been continued.

== Ruling of Supreme Court ==
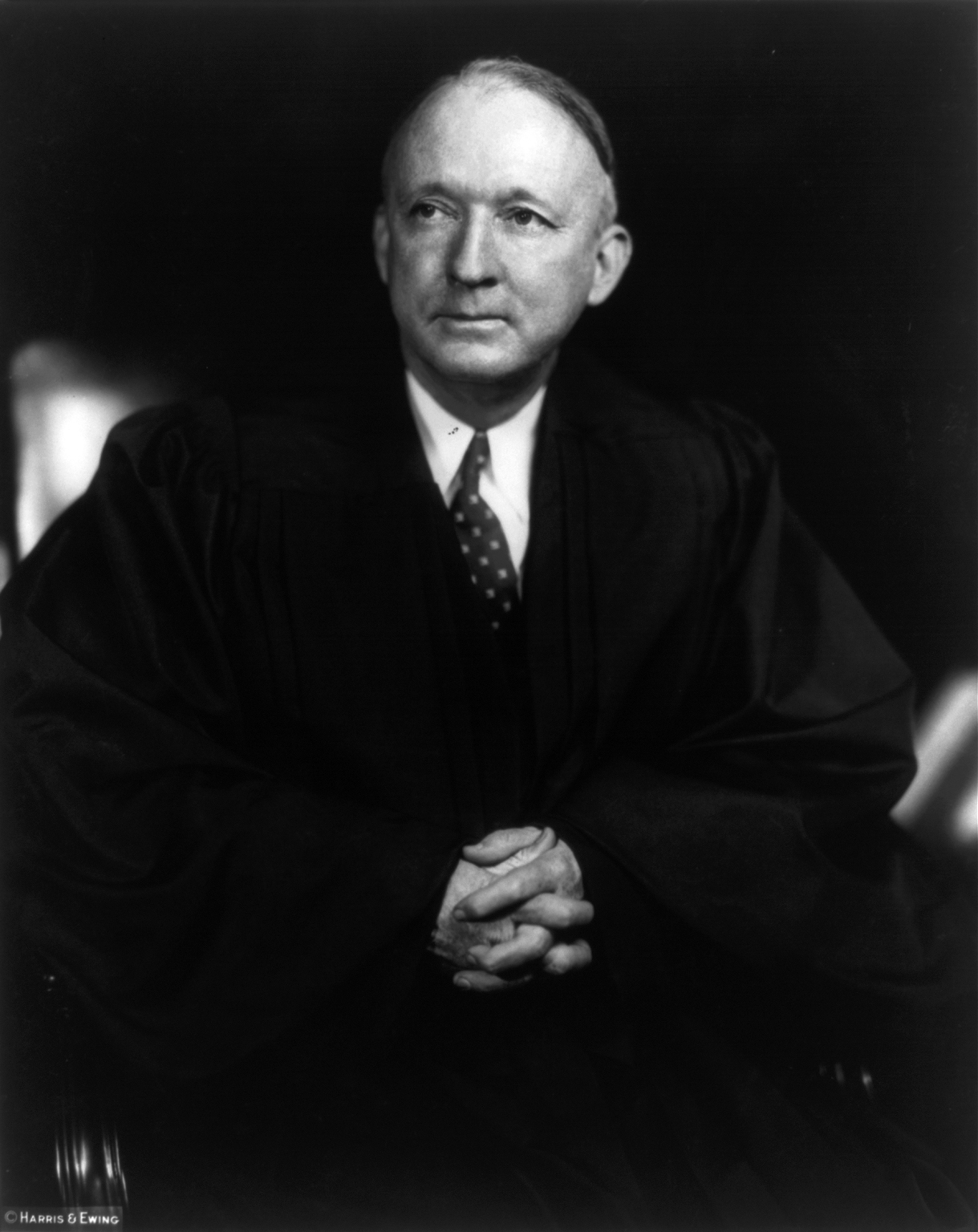
Justice Hugo Black delivered the opinion of the Court

Hazel sought further review in the Supreme Court, which reversed in a 5-4 opinion that Justice Hugo Black delivered for the Court. Four justices dissented on procedural grounds, believing that the case should have been decided in the district court rather than the court of appeals.

=== Majority opinion ===
The Court rejected each of the three reasons that the Third Circuit gave for denying the petition. First, the general rule that federal courts will not alter or set aside their judgments after the expiration of the term at which the judgments were finally entered is not inviolable. "From the beginning," Black wrote, citing the court's 1878 decision in United States v. Throckmorton, "there has existed alongside the term rule a rule of equity to the effect that, under certain circumstances, one of which is after-discovered fraud, relief will be granted against judgments regardless of the term of their entry" and "where the situation has required, the court has, in some manner, devitalized the judgment even though the term at which it was entered had long since passed away", relying on an 1891 decision, Marshall v. Holmes, which allowed an unconscionability exception from Throckmorton's rule generally barring equitable relief in cases of intrinsic fraud such as how Hartford characterized its actions. The Court condemned Hartford's conduct as "a deliberately planned and carefully executed scheme to defraud not only the Patent Office, but the Circuit Court of Appeals."

Next, because of public policy, the Court rejected the Third Circuit's condonation of Hartford's fraud on the grounds of Hazel's failure to exercise sufficient diligence:

This matter does not concern only private parties. There are issues of great moment to the public in a patent suit. Furthermore, tampering with the administration of justice in the manner indisputably shown here involves far more than an injury to a single litigant. It is a wrong against the institutions set up to protect and safeguard the public, institutions in which fraud cannot complacently be tolerated consistently with the good order of society. Surely it cannot be that preservation of the integrity of the judicial process must always wait upon the diligence of litigants. The public welfare demands that the agencies of public justice be not so impotent that they must always be mute and helpless victims of deception and fraud.

Third, the Court challenged the Third Circuit's argument that the fraudulent conduct was not "basic’ to the 1932 decision and the factual allegations in the article were actually true. Hartford persuaded the court of appeals to reverse the district court's judgment on the basis of the article, and is therefore estopped from claiming it was not effective. Moreover: "The article, even if true, should have stood or fallen under the only title it could honestly have been given—that of a brief in behalf of Hartford, prepared by Hartford's agents, attorneys, and collaborators."

Hartford had conceded that the district court has the power, upon proper proof of fraud, to set aside its 1932 decree in a bill of review proceeding, but nevertheless denied that the court of appeals possesses a similar power, for the reason that the term during which its 1932 judgment was entered had expired. The Court disagreed and held that the court of appeals had "both the duty and the power to vacate its own judgment and to give the district court appropriate directions" to set aside its judgment entered pursuant to the Third Circuit's previous mandate and to reinstate its original judgment denying relief to Hartford.

=== Dissenting opinion ===
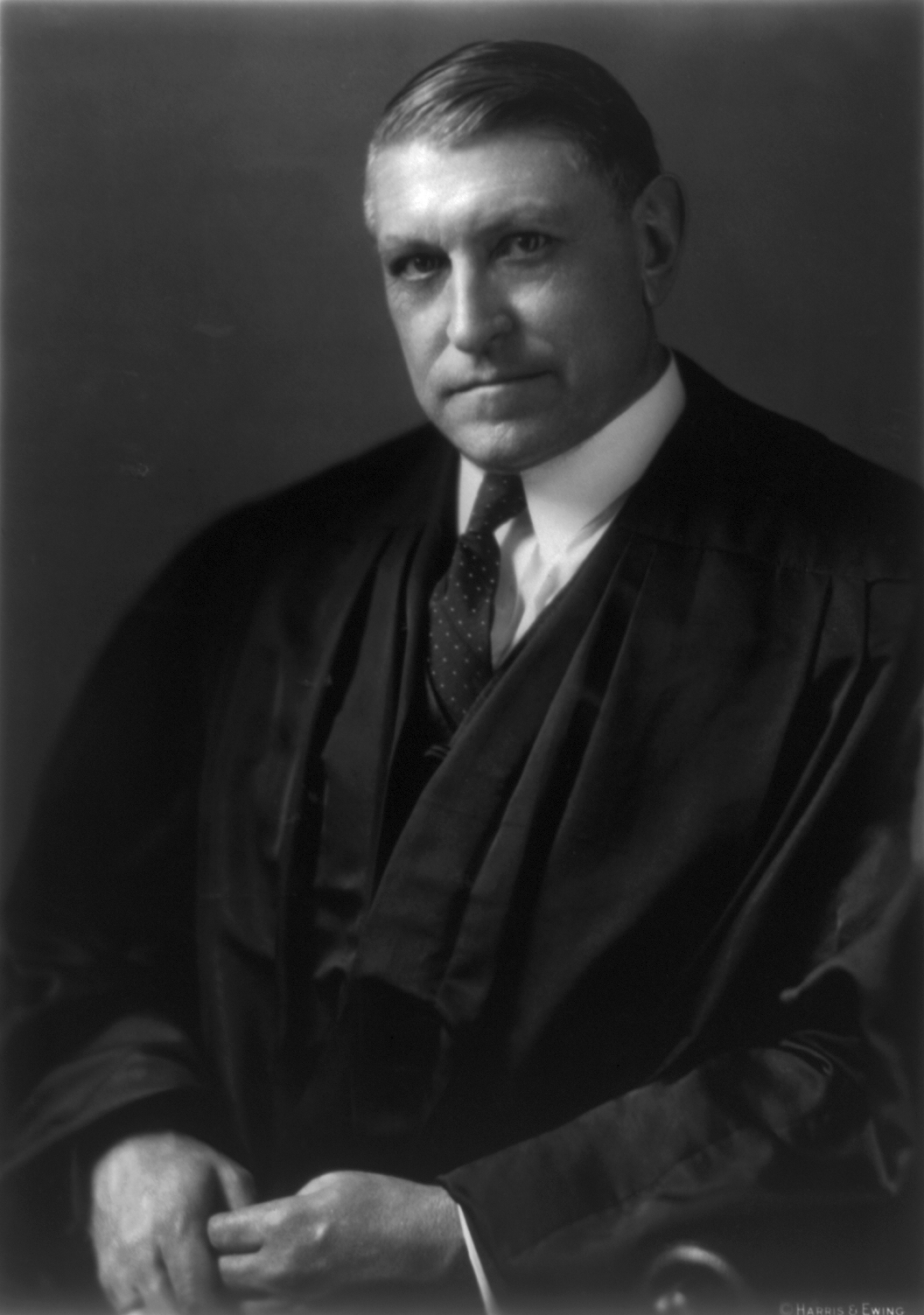
Owen J. Roberts delivered the dissent

In dissent, Justice Owen Roberts conceded: "No fraud is more odious than an attempt to subvert the administration of justice. The court is unanimous in condemning the transaction disclosed by this record. Our problem is how best the wrong should be righted and the wrongdoers pursued." He then summarized the majority holding, with which he disagreed only on procedural grounds, as follows:

(1) That the court below has power at this date to deal with the matter either as a new suit or as a continuation of the old one; (2) that it can recall the case from the District Court; (3) that it can grant relief; (4) that it can hear evidence and act as a court of first instance or a trial court; (5) that such a trial as it affords need not be according to the ordinary course of trial of facts in open court, by examination and cross-examination of witnesses, but that the proofs may consist merely of ex parte affidavits, and (6) that such a trial has already been afforded, and it remains only, in effect, to cancel Hartford's patent.

Roberts said the court of appeals lacked power to operate in this manner once the time to correct an erroneous judgment has passed, and the only proper way to deal with this case would be by a new action in the district court. Courts of appeals lack original jurisdiction to hold trials, and the proceeding should be by way of taking testy from witnesses, not use of affidavits as here. Roberts pointed to additional facts that he believed should be considered. The settlement agreement resulted to Hazel's becoming a co-conspirator in the market-allocation scheme condemned in the recent Hartford-Empire case and profiting greatly from the antitrust violation. Roberts therefore concluded that the majority:

holds that, solely because of the fraud which was practiced on the Patent Office and in litigation on the patent, the owner of the patent is to be amerced and in effect fined for the benefit of the other party to the suit, although that other comes with unclean hands and stands adjudged a party to a conspiracy to benefit over a period of twelve years under the aegis of the very patent it now attacks for fraud. To disregard these considerations, to preclude inquiry concerning these matters, is recklessly to punish one wrongdoer for the benefit of another.

Justices Stanley Reed and Felix Frankfurter joined in this dissenting opinion, while Chief Justice Harlan Stone simply agreed with the result that the dissent suggested.

== See also ==
- List of United States Supreme Court cases, volume 322
- List of United States Supreme Court cases by the Stone Court
