= Trial of Joseph Spell =

1940 trial in Connecticut, US

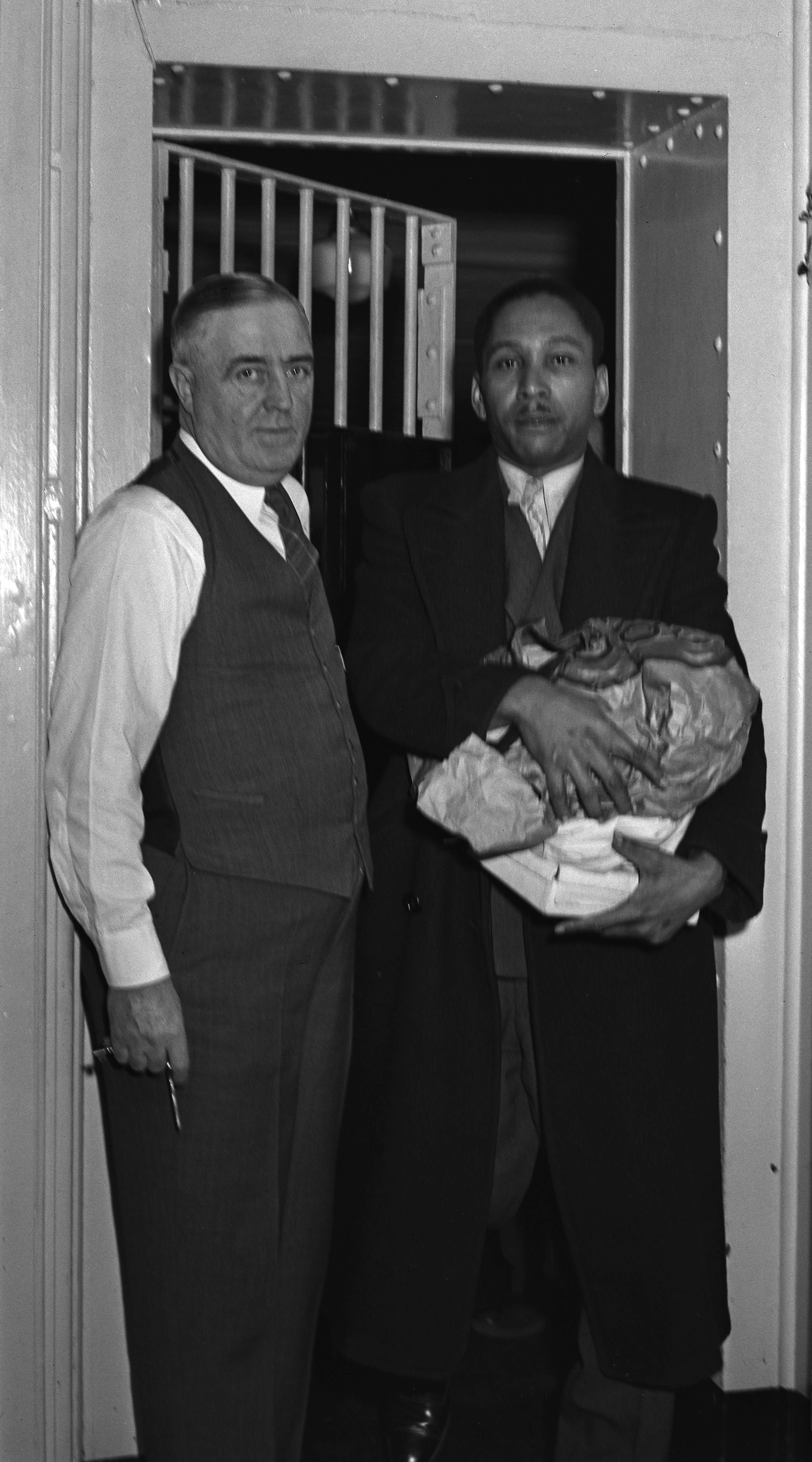
Spell is released from Fairfield County Jail in Bridgeport, Connecticut following his acquittal, February 3, 1941

The trial of Joseph Spell was a 1940 legal case - State of Connecticut v. Joseph Spell - in which an African-American chauffeur was accused of raping Eleanor Strubing, a wealthy white woman who was his boss. The accusations and trial made sensational headlines. Spell was represented by Samuel Friedman and future US Supreme Court justice Thurgood Marshall. The case is featured in the 2017 film Marshall.

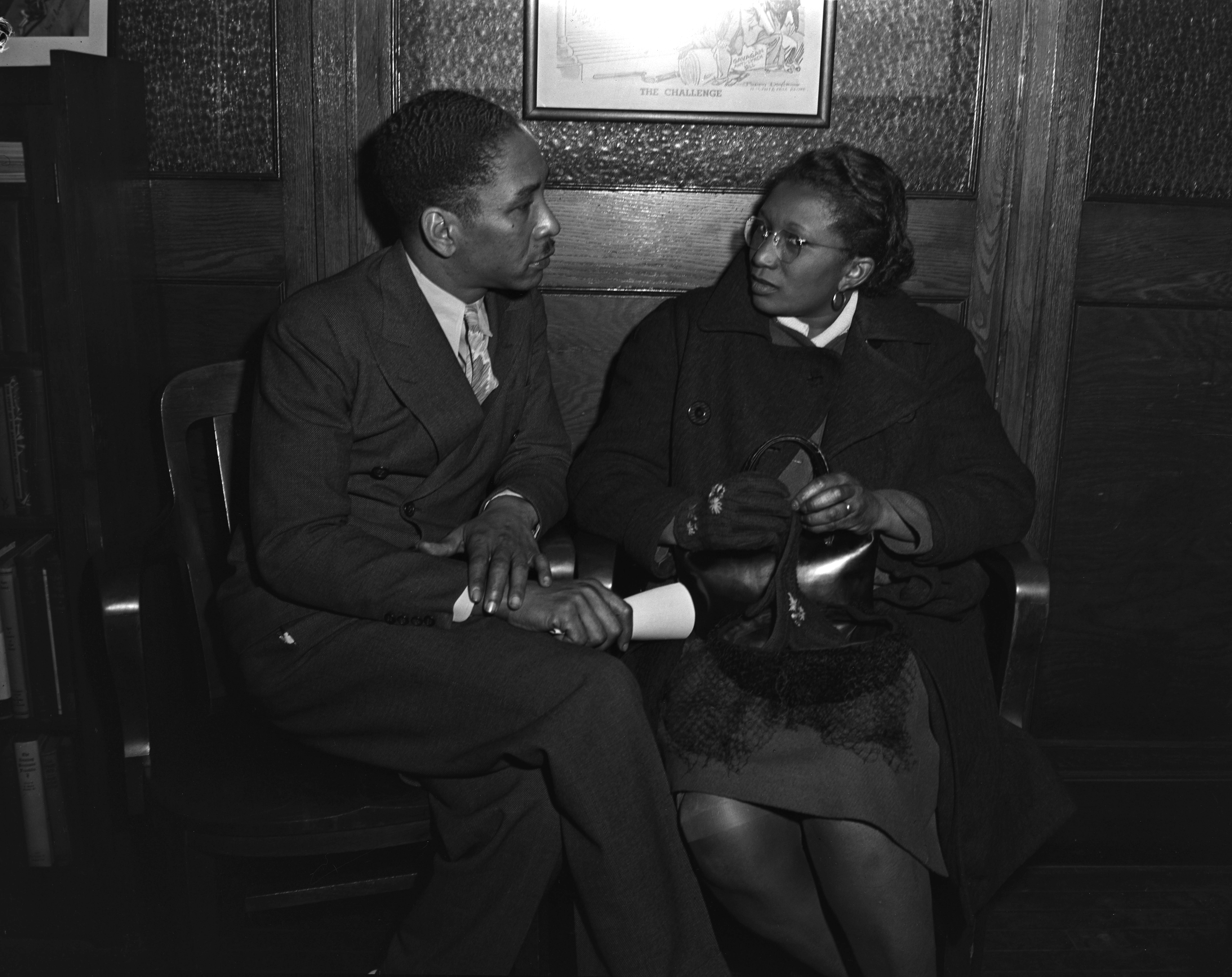
Spell is reunited with his wife, Virginia Clark, in New York City following his acquittal, February 3, 1941

After 17 hours of questioning Spell confessed to being intimate with Strubing, but (contrary to police accounts) said that he had never confessed to raping her. The trial jury in January of 1941 found him not guilty.

== Background ==
Spell was born in Lafayette, Louisiana in 1909. He married at 17, split with his wife after three months, but never got a divorce. He served in the U.S. Army before being dishonorably discharged after getting drunk, stealing an officer's car, and crashing it. At the time of the rape accusation he was living in the attic of his employer's home with his common law spouse Virgis Clark, who was employed by the Strubings as a cook.

Eleanor Strubing accused Spell of raping her four times at her home in Greenwich, Connecticut, kidnapping her, forcing her to write a ransom note for $5,000, and attempting to murder her by throwing her from a bridge, all on the night of December 10-11, 1940. On the morning of December 11 Strubing was found by two truck drivers by the Kensico Reservoir in Westchester County, New York, soaking wet and injured.

Spell claimed that their sexual encounter was consensual, and that he suggested they go for a drive when she became anxious about becoming pregnant. While Spell at first claimed to have had no connection with Strubing's injuries and fall into the reservoir, he later confessed that she had asked him to pull over at the reservoir and had thrown herself into the reservoir. He claimed that her physical injuries were caused when he attempted to stop her from jumping. Spell was acquitted on January 31, 1941. The jury had deliberated for nearly 13 hours. Immediately after the trial Marshall travelled to Oklahoma to assist with the defense of W.D. Lyons.

== In media ==
Some elements of the trial and surrounding events were depicted in the 2017 movie Marshall. Spell was portrayed by Sterling K. Brown and Thurgood Marshall by Chadwick Boseman.
