= Fraud in the factum =

Type of fraud

Fraud in the factum is a type of fraud where misrepresentation causes one to enter a transaction without accurately realizing the risks, duties, or obligations incurred. This can be when the maker or drawer of a negotiable instrument, such as a promissory note or check, is induced to sign the instrument without a reasonable opportunity to learn of its fraudulent character or essential terms. Determination of whether an act constitutes fraud in the factum depends upon consideration of "all relevant factors". Fraud in the factum usually voids the instrument under state law and is a real defense against even a holder in due course.

Contrast this with the situation where a trusted employee signs a check without permission. The employer must still honor the check despite the fact that the check was a fraudulent negotiable instrument. Here, the employer had a reasonable opportunity to avoid the obligation by restricting access to the checks.

Fraud in the factum is often contrasted with fraud in the inducement.

Fraud in the factum is a legal defense, and occurs where A makes/signs an agreement, but either does not realize that it is supposed to be a contract, or does not understand the nature/content of the agreement, because of some false information that B gave to A. For example, suppose John tells his mother that he is taking a college course on Handwriting Analysis, and for his homework he needs her to read and sign a pretend deed. If Mom signs the deed believing what he told her, and John tries to enforce the deed, Mom can plead "fraud in the factum".

Fraud in the inducement is an equitable defense, and occurs when A enters into an agreement, knowing that it is supposed to be a contract and (at least having a rough idea) what the agreement is about, but the reason A signed/made the agreement was because of some false information that B gave to A. For example, suppose John tells his mother to sign a deed giving him her property, Mom refuses at first, but then John falsely tells her that the bank will foreclose on the property unless she signs it over to him. If Mom signs the deed because of this statement from John, and John tries to enforce the deed, Mom can plead "fraud in the inducement".

== See also ==
- As is
- Extrinsic fraud
- Fraud
- Intrinsic fraud
- Per minas
