= Extrinsic fraud =

Legal concept

Extrinsic fraud is fraud that induces one not to present a case in court or deprives one of the opportunity to be heard or is not involved in the actual issues. More broadly, it is defined as:

fraudulent acts which keep a person from obtaining information about his/her rights to enforce a contract or getting evidence to defend against a lawsuit. This could include destroying evidence or misleading an ignorant person about the right to sue. Extrinsic fraud is distinguished from intrinsic fraud, which is the fraud that is the subject of a lawsuit.

Extrinsic fraud often involves fraud on the court, but may arise in other contexts. Extrinsic fraud does not mean merely lying or perjury, nor misrepresentations, nor intrinsic fraud, nor "to matters that could have been raised during the divorce proceeding." It must involve "collateral ... circumstances" such as:

1. "bribery of a judge or juror,"
2. "fabrication of evidence by an attorney,"
3. "preventing another party's witness from appearing,"
4. "intentionally failing to join a necessary party," or
5. "misleading another party into thinking a continuance had been granted...."

The U.S. Supreme Court distinguished extrinsic fraud from intrinsic fraud in the 1878 case United States v. Throckmorton. Where, "by reason of something done by the successful party to a suit, there was in fact no adversary trial or decision of the issue in the case", an unsuccessful litigant is entitled to equitable relief from the judgement thus obtained, or a new trial if the fraud prevented that from happening.

== Examples ==
=== Family law ===
Extrinsic fraud may be claimed in family law and domestic relations cases. For example, paternity cases are sometimes the subject of extrinsic fraud; the classic case is when a man is encouraged to sign an acknowledgment that he is the father of a newborn baby, thus giving up his right to contest the matter in a filiation action.

In Love v. Love, the Nevada Supreme Court ruled that extrinsic fraud had led the putative father to sign an admission against his interest, thus allowing the court to grant equitable relief to undo the fraud. It also may occur when a man fails to appear in court when a paternity suit is filed against him, thus resulting in a default judgment due to the fraud by his "paramour".

In such cases, there is a high burden of proof (typically moral certainty or beyond a reasonable doubt) of the petitioner to prove the intrinsic fraud, because of the state's interest "in the best interests of the child" to ensure that every child has a father. That is called paternity by estoppel, in which the putative father is actually prevented from proving he is not the father due to the high standard of evidence necessary as a matter of law.

=== Other examples ===
Extrinsic fraud may occur in real estate transactions or financing, such as when a lender forces a homeowner to lose their real property in a foreclosure through acts of fraud.

A lawyer who intentionally keeps information from their client about an upcoming hearing or trial could be held responsible for extrinsic fraud, as well as being subject to disciplinary action and a legal malpractice lawsuit.

It is at least theoretically possible for a court to enjoin a criminal proceeding, but unlikely. A writ of habeas corpus or writ of error coram nobis may be possible as well.

== See also ==
- Collateral estoppel
- Intrinsic fraud
- Per minas
- Res judicata
- Scienter
