= United States v. Throckmorton =

1878 U.S. Supreme Court decision

- Supreme Court of the United States

Decided October 1, 1878
- Full case name: United States v. Throckmorton
- Citations: 98 U.S. 61 (more) 25 L.Ed. 93

Holding
- State interest in resolving litigation and preventing double jeopardy bars courts of equity from untimely reconsideration of decided cases where a party alleges evidence before the court during the proceeding it had opportunity to impeach was fraudulent. District of California affirmed

Court membership
- Chief Justice Morrison Waite Associate Justices Nathan Clifford · Noah H. Swayne; Samuel F. Miller · Stephen J. Field; William Strong · Joseph P. Bradley; Ward Hunt · John M. Harlan

Case opinion
- Majority: Miller, joined by unanimous

Laws applied
- Common law of civil procedure

United States v. Throckmorton (98 U.S. 61) is an 1878 decision of the U.S. Supreme Court on civil procedure, specifically res judicata, in cases heard at equity. A unanimous Court affirmed an appeal of a decision by the District Court for California upholding a Mexican-era land claim, holding that collateral estoppel bars untimely motions to set aside the verdict where the purportedly fraudulent evidence has already been considered and a decision reached. In the opinion it distinguished between that kind of fraud, which it called intrinsic, and extrinsic fraud, in which deceptive actions exterior to the proceeding prevented a party, or potential party, to the action from becoming aware of the possibility they could vindicate their rights in court.

The land claim at issue had been filed with the district court in the early 1850s by Richardson, a settler who had lived in California since 1838. He had followed Mexican procedures; Mexican government records verified this and suggested that he would receive the grant but the final decree had never been sent. So, the U.S. federal government claimed, he went to former Mexican governor Manuel Micheltorena with his land claim pending and obtained from him a backdated decree, supported by perjured affidavits from purported witnesses to the signing. Only in the 1870s, while reviewing other paperwork, did government lawyers in the Attorney General's office learn of this and bring the case.

Justice Samuel Freeman Miller found little precedent supporting the government's position, and much in opposition, including not only decisions of American courts but those of English courts dating to the beginning of the 18th century. He also cited established legal principles of double jeopardy and the state's interest in not having litigation continue indefinitely. On the facts of the case, he noted that the original petition had taken the court five years to approve, and it was thoroughly inspected, or could have been, by the government's lawyers at the time. Nor did the government offer any new evidence of the fraud, or indicate that the Attorney General had authorized the new litigation.

The rule laid down in Throckmorton has been seen as problematized by Marshall v. Holmes, a decision issued 13 years later in a similar case seeking to revisit a result due to the use of allegedly forged evidence; in it a dictum suggested that courts could set aside verdicts in cases of intrinsic fraud if they found the results obtained to be unconscionable. A circuit split developed over which case was controlling during the late 1930s, but the Court declined to resolve it, although it has modified and clarified the rule in several decisions since then; Federal Rule of Civil Procedure 60(b) has also limited Throckmorton's applicability. The Third Circuit and several states have rejected Throckmorton in favor of Marshall.

== Underlying dispute ==
At some time prior to 1838, W.A. Richardson settled in what was then Alta California, under Mexican sovereignty. After establishing himself, he petitioned the Mexican governor to grant him title to the land he had been living on. Records from the governor's office, and Richardson's espediente, showed that there was no objection or previous claim to the property or Richardson's continued residence there, and that the petition would likely be granted. But Richardson never received the actual decree from the governor's office.

After California became a U.S. state in 1850, Richardson petitioned its Board of Land Commissioners to have his title accepted under its laws, which the board granted in 1853. Afterwards, it was appealed to the federal District Court for California, which affirmed it in 1856; an appeal to the Supreme Court was withdrawn by the Attorney General the following year. Richardson's petition was supported by a decree signed by Manuel Micheltorena, former Mexican governor of Alta California, and affidavits from eyewitnesses attesting to his having signed the document on a date when he was governor.

Richardson died and his heirs sold the land. By the 1870s, it came to the attention of the Attorney General's office that he had actually obtained Micheltorena's signature in 1852, during the pendency of the land claim before the board of land commissioners, long after the former governor had any authority to sign such a decree, and backdated it. The affidavits supporting his signature were likewise allegedly perjured. Howard, a lawyer representing the government at the board, had apparently been aware of this ruse, or at least its possibility, but did not inform the commissioners.

Howard by then owned some of the Richardson land. In 1876, the federal government filed a petition in the district court, naming him and the other landowners, with Throckmorton as the lead defendant, asking to have the land claim invalidated on the grounds that it had been fraudulently obtained. The court declined; the government appealed to the Supreme Court. (Note: At the time the circuits of the United States Court of Appeals had not yet been created; all cases from federal district courts were appealed directly to the Supreme Court.)

== Supreme Court ==
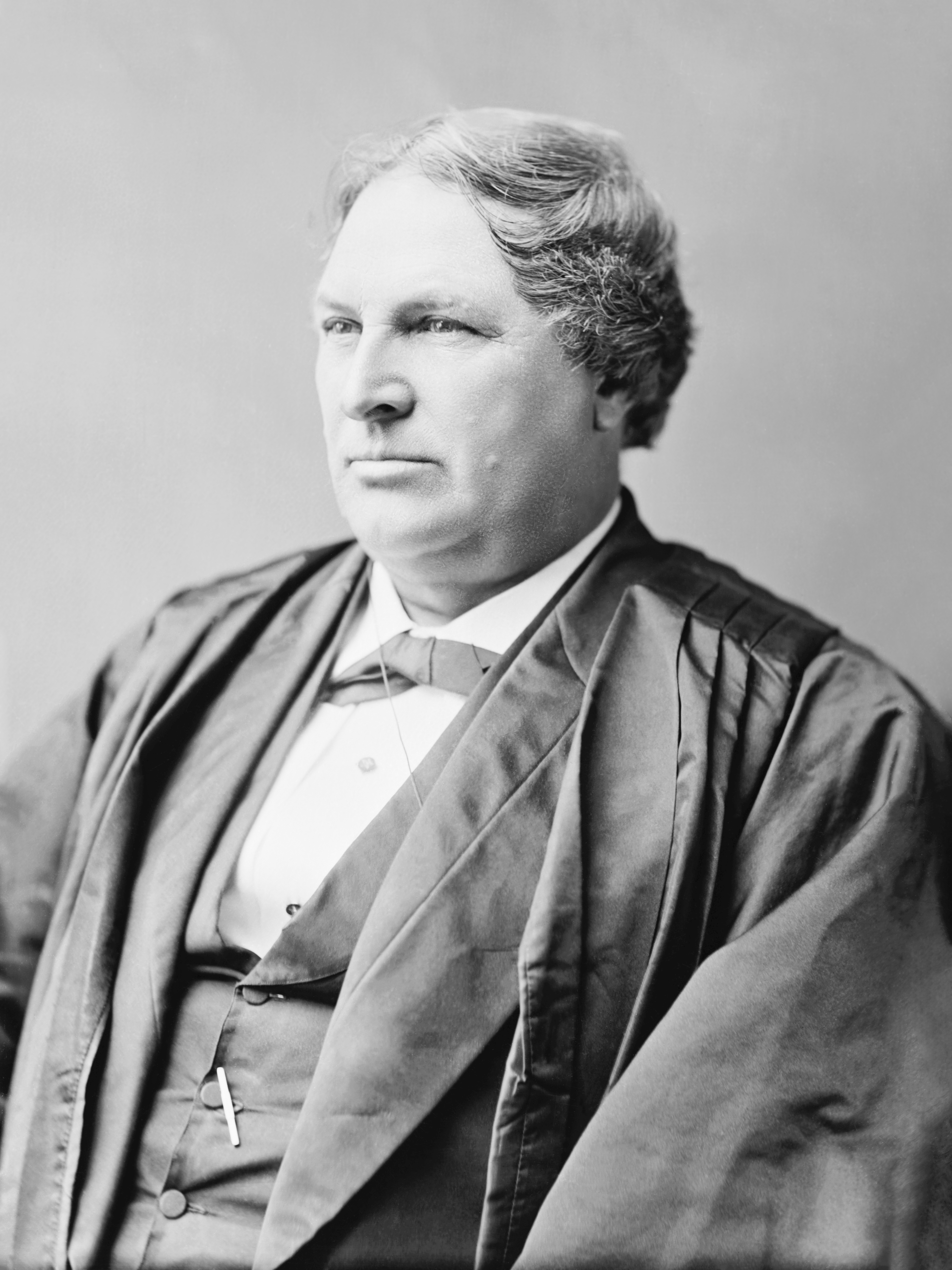
Justice Miller

Writing for a unanimous court that ruled against the government, Justice Samuel Freeman Miller first took note of the fact that at the time of the disputed grant, Richardson had already been living on his land for almost 20 years; the Court also had never held in any other cases arising from claims in formerly Mexican lands that receipt of the final documentation was absolutely necessary to prove title, especially when the claimant was already in possession. While the government's brief had discussed the fraud upon the court in the original proceeding at great length, Miller also noted, it made no allegations of malfeasance against Howard, an omission suggesting the government believed that he had merely been negligent.

Miller turned next to the government's arguments. He agreed that unlike a private plaintiff the government was not bound by a statute of limitations, but that would not suffice to sustain the motion. The question was whether the Court had jurisdiction. He agreed that "fraud vitiates the most solemn contracts, documents, and even judgments", but also that the "lapse of time ... the difficulty of proving the fraud, and ... the protection which the law throws around rights once established by formal judicial proceedings in tribunals established by law, according to the methods of the law" make it difficult to expose older frauds.

This led Miller to two Latin legal maxims: interest rei publicae, ut sit finis litium ("there is a public interest in there being an end to litigation") and nemo debet bis vexari pro una et eadam causa ("no one shall be punished or tried twice for the same cause"). The procedures to remedy mistakes of law or fact in trials, such as appeals or retrials, were well-established and did not offend these principles as long as the procedures were followed. "But there is an admitted exception to this general rule in cases where, by reason of something done by the successful party to a suit, there was in fact no adversary trial or decision of the issue in the case", he continued. These would include situations where deception was employed to keep evidence out of the case, or to prevent the defendant from being aware of the action, corrupt behavior by an attorney—situations that, Miller said, kept a party from presenting a full case in court, and thus there was greater latitude for allowing a new proceeding, citing many state and federal precedents.

By contrast, "the doctrine is equally well settled that the court will not set aside a judgment because it was founded on a fraudulent instrument, or perjured evidence, or for any matter which was actually presented and considered in the judgment assailed" Miller wrote, quoting a work on res judicata, since it was usually the parties' responsibility to unearth evidence of fraud during the original action. There was only one American precedent that suggested otherwise.

Miller reviewed some of the precedents in the case, starting with Tovey v Young, a 1702 case heard by the English Court of Chancery, where a merchant who had unsuccessfully sought to recover from a cheesemonger who had sold to his agent even after the merchant had let the cheesemonger know he had revoked the buyer's purchasing authority asked for a new trial, having learned since the judgment that the supposedly primary defense witness was a partner of the cheesemonger's. The case had already been unsuccessfully appealed to the Master of the Rolls, and Miller quoted the opinion of Lord Keeper Nathan Wright: "New matter may in some cases be ground for relief, but it must not be what was tried before; nor, when it consists in swearing only, will I ever grant a new trial, unless it appears by deeds, or writing, or that a witness on whose testimony the verdict was given was convicted of perjury, or the jury attainted."

That passage had been cited in an 1814 opinion of New York's Court of Chancery, denying a new trial to a salt merchant. After a judgment against him for breach of contract, the man had learned that the plaintiff had arranged a fictitious salt sale with one of his witnesses at a price over market value in order to win a higher damage award. Chancellor James Kent noted that the merchant had to have known that the price of salt would be an issue at trial, and could reasonably have been expected to prepare evidence of that.

"The best discussion" of this issue, Miller said, was in an 1854 divorce case heard by the Massachusetts Supreme Judicial Court. The plaintiff sought to have the divorce granted to her former husband five years earlier reversed due to fraud and collusion. The court's chief justice, Lemuel Shaw, had reviewed the earlier precedents and distinguished intrinsic fraud, which was what the government alleged in the instant case, from extrinsic fraud, the actions he had described earlier which would serve to prevent a truly honest and fair trial and thereby justify ordering a new trial. "We think these decisions establish the doctrine on which we decide the present case", Miller concluded.

Miller believed this rule was in the greater interest of the judicial system: "That the mischief of retrying every case in which the judgment or decree rendered on false testimony, given by perjured witnesses, or on contracts or documents whose genuineness or validity was in issue, and which are afterwards ascertained to be forged or fraudulent, would be greater, by reason of the endless nature of the strife, than any compensation arising from doing justice in individual cases." Again, he noted that the government had offered no proof that Howard's supposed failure to inform the courts of the falsification of the decree and the perjury supporting it had come from any deliberate intent on his part, which if it had might have allowed relief.

Lastly Miller found another reversible error. By statute, only the Attorney General or someone he explicitly authorized to do so could bring this kind of action. Yet the paperwork bore only the name of Walter Van Dyke, then U.S. Attorney for the District of California. It did not appear as if he or anyone in the government was even very interested in the case, as no lawyer representing its side had appeared at oral argument.

A copy of a bond attached to the record, but unmentioned within it, signed by some private individuals and holding the federal government harmless, did say that the Attorney General had authorized Van Dyke to bring the action. Miller was not convinced. "It would be a very dangerous doctrine, one threatening the title to millions of acres of land held by patent from the government, if any man who has a grudge or a claim against his neighbor can, by indemnifying the government for costs, and furnishing the needed stimulus to a district attorney, institute a suit in chancery in the United States to declare the patent void."

== Subsequent jurisprudence ==
=== Supreme Court ===
A little over a decade after Throckmorton, Marshall v. Holmes seemed to offer an exception to what it had announced as an ironclad rule. But given the chance to speak more clearly to the issue five years later, the Court declined. The only time since that it has considered the question of equitable relief over intrinsic fraud, in the mid-20th century, it has created another exception.

==== Marshall v. Holmes ====
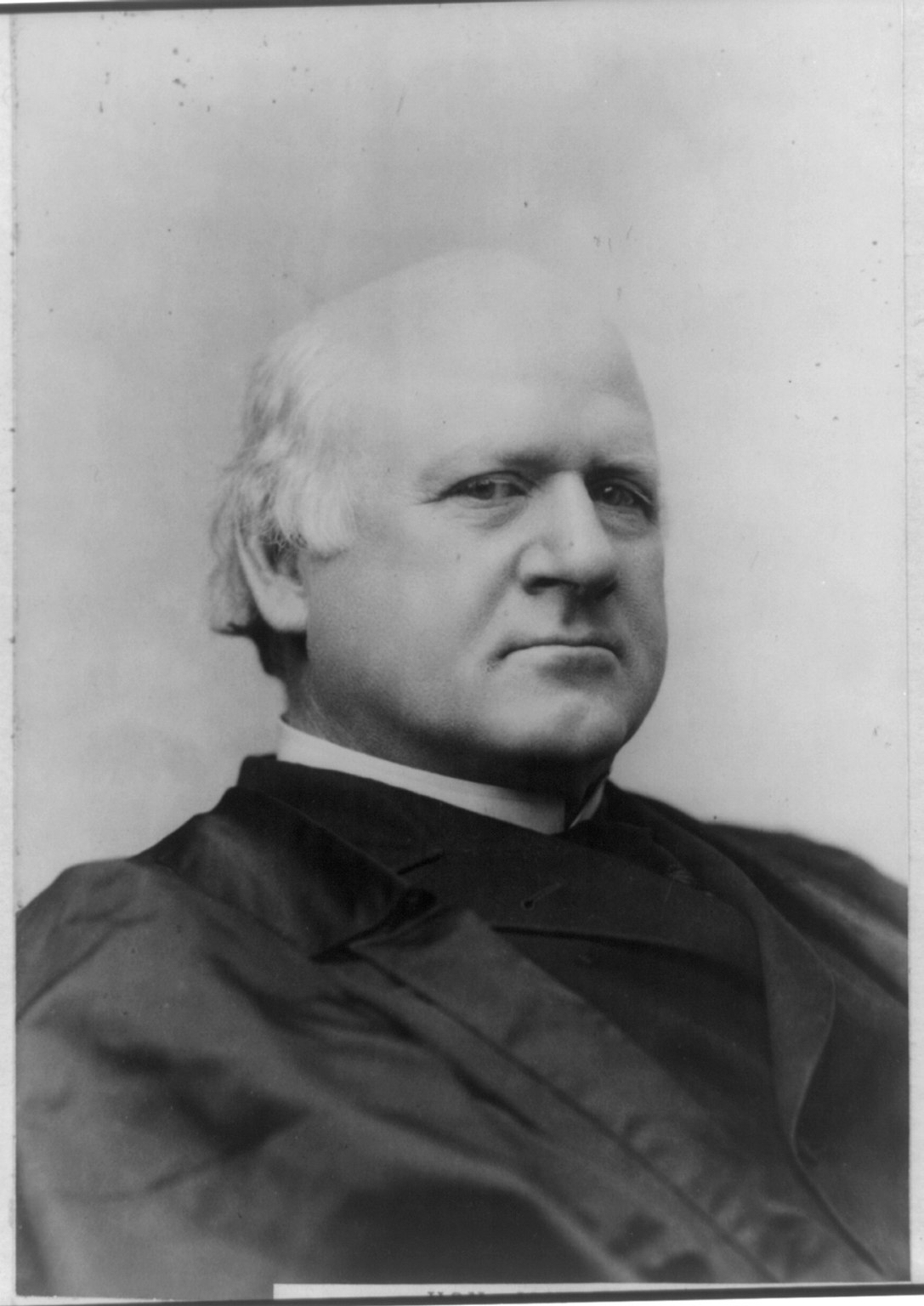
Justice Harlan in 1890

In 1891, the Court heard Marshall v. Holmes, in which the petitioner, a New York woman, sought on appeal from Louisiana state court to have her attempt to set aside a judgment against her due to allegedly fraudulent evidence removed to federal court in her native state under diversity. Justice John Marshall Harlan, a member of the Throckmorton Court, wrote for an again unanimous Court that held in her favor.

Marshall sought a new trial on the grounds that a letter used as evidence in the original trial had been forged. Harlan reiterated the existing doctrine that courts of equity will not normally disturb a verdict reached at law, but then quoted from the Court's 1813 Marine Insurance Co. v. Hodgson decision to the effect that "any fact which clearly proves it to be against conscience to execute a judgment, and of which the injured party could not have availed himself in a court of law, or of which he might have availed himself at law, but was prevented by fraud or accident, unmixed with any fault or negligence in himself or his agents, will justify an application to a court of chancery." At the end of his list of precedents Harlan added "See also United States v. Throckmorton".

Another recent case from Louisiana, Barrow v. Hunton, had invoked the "somewhat nice", as Justice Joseph P. Bradley put it, distinction between cases where a litigant seeking federal jurisdiction merely alleged error and those where new evidence of fraud was available. In that case it had found the fraud intrinsic, but in two other cases, applying the same rule, the fraud was determined to be extrinsic, making the proceeding original and clearing the way for federal review. "These authorities would seem to place beyond question the jurisdiction of the Circuit Court to take cognizance of the present suit, which is none the less an original, independent suit, because it relates to judgments obtained in the court of another jurisdiction", Harlan wrote. A federal court's order barring the respondent from enforcing the state court's order would thus not be in conflict with federal law barring federal courts from staying the proceedings of state courts, rather "[i]t would simply take from him the benefit of judgments obtained by fraud."

==== Graver v. Faurot ====
Five years later the Court was asked to resolve an apparent contradiction between Marshall and Throckmorton, or at least clarify the distinction between intrinsic and extrinsic fraud, in Graver v. Faurot. In 1889 Graver sued Faurot after an investment the latter had recommended to him went poorly; Graver believed that Faurot had concealed both the company's true condition and his interest. But after both Faurot and his codefendant, Bailey, the company owner, denied the scheme under oath, Graver agreed to dismiss the case.

Three years later, Faurot's bank failed, and from records disclosed during the bankruptcy proceedings, including records filed with the federal government two years prior to the transaction, Graver was able to confirm his original suspicions: Faurot had actually owned a portion of the company, and he and Bailey had agreed to divide the proceeds of the deal with Graver. With this evidence in hand, Graver went to the Northern District of Illinois, seeking equitable relief and a chance to retry the case.

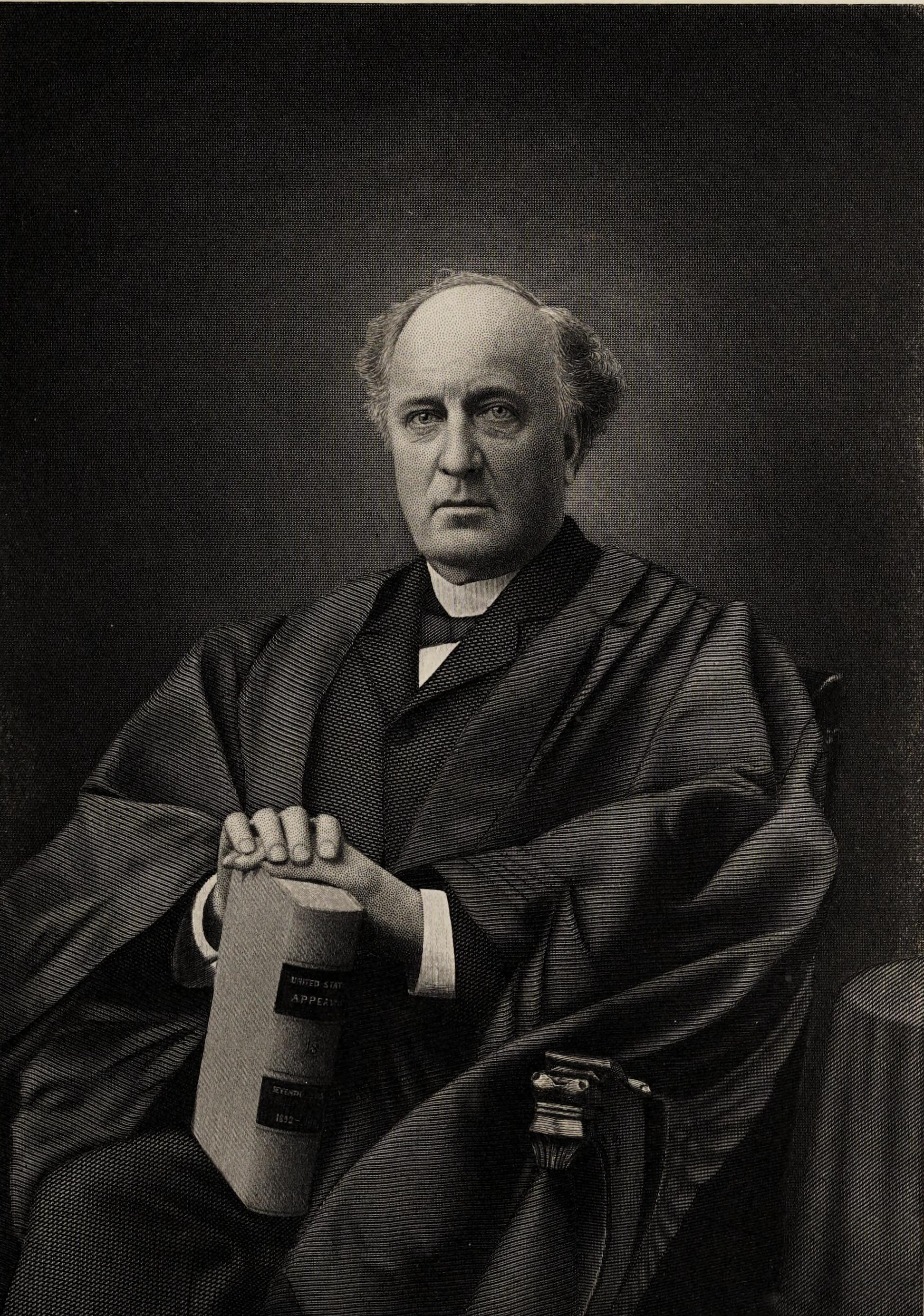
Judge James Graham Jenkins

Judge James Graham Jenkins found Graver's petition to be an original suit that he could consider. "Assuming the facts to be as stated in this bill, I have been impressed with the conviction that the complainant has been grievously defrauded", he wrote in 1894. But he could not determine whether Throckmorton and Marshall controlled and thus whether he could grant Graver relief:

I am unable to distinguish those two cases upon the facts. The nature of the fraud was the same in both cases. In both the fraud was in the use of forged documents and false evidence offered by the successful party. In the one case the bill was dismissed, and in the other sustained. Both decisions were by a unanimous court. Three of the justices who were members of the court when the former case was decided were members of the court when the latter case was decided, including the justice who delivered the opinion of the court. I do not see how both can stand, and yet the former case is approvingly referred to in the latter. Possibly the fault is mine, that I am unable to distinguish them. In the doubtful frame of mind in which I am left: by these two apparently conflicting decisions, I might have recourse to the maxim that the greater regard should be given to the latter decision, were it not for the fact that in the latter case the former decision is approvingly referred to, and apparently sought to be followed.

Jenkins ruled procedural for the defendants and suggested the problem might be resolved on appeal.

The Seventh Circuit Court of Appeals decided to certify the question to the Supreme Court before attempting to decide the case. In 1896 the Court unanimously declined. As part of the record, the Seventh Circuit had submitted the entire case, which, Chief Justice Melville Fuller wrote, put the Supreme Court in a difficult position. Statute forbid the appellate circuits from submitting an entire case to the Court without a specific question or questions to resolve.

"[I]f we should find that the bill was insufficient when tested by principles accepted in both the cases referred to, we should be indisposed to return an answer not required for the disposition of the case," Fuller observed. "This practically requires us to pass upon the whole case as it stands, and to decide whether the demurrer was properly sustained or not." Thus, he said, the Court would not consider the question unless the whole case was appealed to it. (Note: A year after Graver, in Hilton v Guyot, the Court explicitly reaffirmed Throckmorton, characterizing its holding as "the fraud which entitles a party to impeach the judgment of one of our own tribunals must be fraud extrinsic to the matter tried in the cause, and not merely consist in false and fraudulent documents or testimony submitted to that tribunal, and the truth of which was contested before it and passed upon by it." Neither Fuller nor Harlan joined Horace Gray's majority.)

On remand, the Seventh Circuit issued its decision, holding provisionally for Graver, later that year. Judge William Allen Woods wrote for a unanimous three-judge panel that carefully considered the distinction drawn in the two cases. "[M]anifestly it is not true of a complainant in equity that when he brings his bill he must come prepared with proof to maintain it, and to meet any defense which may be interposed", he wrote. "It is his privilege to search the conscience of his adversary by requiring, him to answer under oath, and if possessed of no other evidence, or means of obtaining it, he must accept or at least yield to the answer as true." Because of the false testimony the case could not go to trial, bringing it under Throckmorton's exception for extrinsic fraud. "The present case does not come within the strict letter, and certainly not within the spirit or reason, of the rule", Woods wrote. Ultimately, Woods concluded, it was not necessary to reconcile the two cases; in fact both of them justified holding for Graver. "There can be and ought to be no repose of society where for such wrongs the courts are incapable of giving redress." (Note: In 1934, the Seventh Circuit called Throckmorton "the controlling case upon the subject for more than a half century" when it relied on it to reverse a district court's injunction preventing an injured railworker from enforcing his judgment against the railroad, a judgment the railroad alleged that he and other witnesses had obtained through perjury that it only learned of when two of those witnesses confessed to their supervisors, on the grounds that the railroad had availed itself of the opportunity to impeach their testimony during the original litigation.)

==== Toledo Scale Co. v. Computing Scale Co. ====
Almost 30 years after Graver, the Supreme Court revisited Throckmorton (Note: A 1912 case, Pickford v. Talbott, had presented a possible opportunity to clarify Throckmorton and the issue of intrinsic vs. extrinsic fraud. The petitioners sought to review a libel verdict the respondent, state's attorney for Montgomery County, Maryland, had won against them over an article they published alleging that his pursuit of a criminal case against them for arson and insurance fraud was motivated by the insurer having retained the respondent's law firm to recover from the petitioners. A month after the libel verdict, petitioner's counsel learned from another judge in the court of a conversation the judge had had with respondent years earlier, at the time of the indictment, tending to support the allegations later found libelous. The Court did not reach the issue of whether Throckmorton applied, not mentioning the case at all, since it did not find the judge's testimony credible and the record did not show the petitioners had made a robust attempt to investigate their claims of respondent's improper motivation at the time of the libel suit. In Hazel-Atlas, the majority opinion cites Pickford, rather than Marshall, as establishing the unconscionability exception to Throckmorton.) in a patent infringement dispute, Toledo Scale Co. v. Computing Scale Co..

The case had begun in 1906 when the respondent sued the petitioner (now Mettler Toledo), alleging infringements of two of its patents on the aluminum cylinder scale it had begun making the previous year. Four years later, the suit before the Court had been brought by Computing in Chicago, alleging a violation of the Smith patent for its eponymous product. Toledo sought in its defense to have the Smith patent invalidated through prior art, noting that its apparent innovations were actually covered by another patent granted in 1870 to Phinney, an inventor in Pawtucket, Rhode Island. In 1912, just before the Seventh Circuit was to consider Toledo's appeal, it sent representatives to Pawtucket to research the history of the Phinney patent. They came to believe that Computing, who Toledo portrayed as an aspiring monopolist bitter over Toledo having exposed the dishonesty of one of its products in 1902, had suppressed evidence of the prior art related to the Phinney patent; the company introduced affidavits to this effect and petitioned for a rehearing in district court on the grounds of extrinsic fraud. It offered no other evidence, in the belief that it could not adequately demonstrate how the Phinney patent covered the material in the Smith since Phinney had deposited a wooden model with his application.

The court declined to remand the case to district court and held for Computing on the grounds that the Smith patent had proven workable while the Phinney patent had not. Eight years later, after investigating in Pawtucket more thoroughly, Toledo found evidence to back up its earlier claims, such as Computing having purchased most of the extant Phinney scales as it could and induced witnesses to remain silent. It returned to the Seventh Circuit and petitioned anew to have the case retried in Ohio, outside the circuit, where Computing had initially sued.

"A true definition of intrinsic fraud should demonstrate what extrinsic fraud is not, and should draw the line of demarcation between the two", wrote Judge Francis E. Baker, who had also written the 1913 opinion, citing Throckmorton as the authority on the subject, and finding it uncontradicted by other cases, including Marshall and Barrow. From that case, he defined intrinsic fraud as "any fraudulent conduct of the successful party which was practiced during the course of an actual adversary trial of the issues joined and which had no effect directly and affirmatively to mislead the defeated party to his injury after he announced that he was ready to proceed with the trial." That would include the use of perjured testimony and/or forged documents; only the original court can grant relief should the fraud be discovered after the decision was rendered.

By contrast, Baker read Throckmorton as holding that extrinsic fraud was:

... any fraudulent conduct of the successful party which was practiced outside of an actual adversary trial (if there ever was one) and which was practiced directly and affirmatively on the defeated party (or his agents, attorneys, or witnesses) whereby he was prevented from presenting fully and fairly his side of the case. If the successful party, by fraud or deception practiced on his opponent, keeps him in ignorance of the suit, or falsely represents that he is merely a nominal party against whom no relief is sought, or lulls his vigilance by a false promise of compromise, or kidnaps his witnesses, or seduces his attorney, or procures an attorney without authority to represent him in court, he is guilty of fraud; and inasmuch as the fraud is extrinsic, that is, a fraud not practiced upon the trial court and the opponent during the course of an actual adversary trial of the controversy between the parties ...

In these cases, any court of equity could entertain an action seeking to remedy the fraud.

The court accepted the fraud allegations as true, noting that "though less iniquitous than the affirmative use of forged documents, false exhibits, and perjured' testimony, [they run] counter to one’s sense of ideal fair play." But that was not enough to settle the issue of whether Toledo was entitled to a new hearing, and Baker, repeating Throckmorton's Latin maxim about how litigation must end at some point, considered the fraud to be intrinsic, since Computing could have obtained all the evidence it later uncovered at the time of the original trial and thus had not done due diligence at that time. "Computing Company's alleged purchases did not prevent Toledo Company from securing abundant examples of the Phinney scales prior to May 1913".

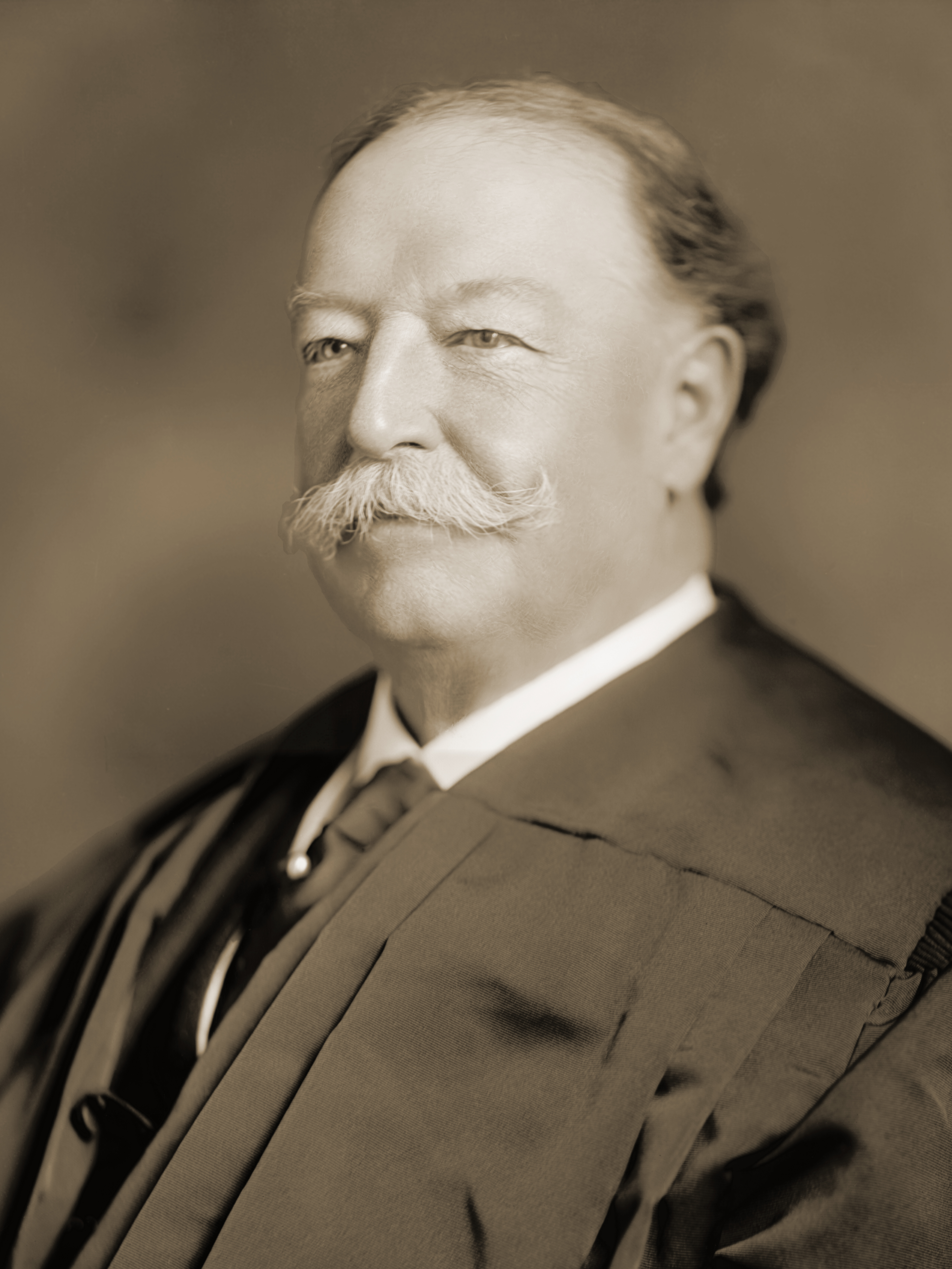
Chief Justice Taft

Toledo appealed to the Supreme Court, which heard the case two years later and unanimously held for Computing a month after oral argument. Chief Justice and former President William Howard Taft, reiterated the Seventh Circuit's finding that Toledo was not entitled to equitable relief as it had had the opportunity to find the evidence of prior use of the Phinney scale, and some extant models, in Pawtucket and Philadelphia before 1913 had it seriously pursued that information. Referencing Throckmorton, he allowed that while there was debate about the "sometimes nice" distinction between the two types of fraud, it was not applicable in this case: "[W]e have been cited to no case where it has been held that fraud is extrinsic when the court rendering the decree attacked had before it the same issue of fraud on the same facts, only a little more elaborated as to the motive of the party charged with committing it."

The holding of Toledo Scale has since been incorporated into the Federal Rules of Civil Procedure. Rule 60(b)(2) allows a motion for a new trial in cases where there is "newly discovered evidence that, with reasonable diligence, could not have been discovered in time to move for a new trial."

==== Hazel-Atlas Glass Co. v. Hartford-Empire Co. ====
In Hazel-Atlas Glass Co. v. Hartford-Empire Co., the Court considered the question of when an apparently intrinsic fraud might be, under special circumstances, unconscionable enough to warrant relief. The case arose from another patent claim, brought by the respondent against its competitor a decade earlier.

===== Lower courts =====
In the late 1920s, Hartford–Empire had developed, and patented, a technique for getting glass into molds called "gob feeding". During the course of the application, lawyers for Hartford wrote an article praising gob feeding as a revolutionary new technique with the intent of having it published in a reputable journal under the name of a supposedly impartial effort; William Clarke, president of the American Flint Glass Workers' Union, agreed to attach his name to it as author when it was published in The Glass Budget. Shortly after the patent was granted, the company sued Hazel–Atlas, a competitor, for infringement, in the Western District of Pennsylvania.

The Clarke article was part of the evidence Hartford's attorneys introduced, although they did not make much use of it in their case; it was considered file wrapper. While Hazel had received some information regarding the article's true origin, they chose not to introduce it to impeach the article, since doing so might bring the court's attention to statements in it favorable to Hartford that they could not effectively rebut. Relying on other arguments, they won a judgment that there had been no infringement since gob feeding was not sufficiently new and innovative enough to be patentable. Hartford appealed to the Third Circuit, this time emphasizing the article in its brief. Hazel only made minor arguments against some of the facts in it, keeping to itself what it had been told about the authorship. The district court was reversed in 1932 by a divided panel, with Judge Joseph Buffington's majority opinion quoting extensively from the Clarke article.

Hazel then attempted to investigate the true authorship of the Clarke article more seriously, to form the basis for an attack on the judgment. That attempt was frustrated when a Hartford attorney reached Clarke first and concluded an agreement with him to accept payment for the article in return for remaining silent. Hazel, no longer seeing any possibility of prevailing in court, and seeing the profit possibilities of coming to an arrangement, paid Hartford a million dollars in licensing fees. Shawkee, another of Hartford's competitors, also learned the truth and attempted to petition for a rehearing and certiorari from the Supreme Court, but was denied.

Hard proof of the truth behind Clarke's article remained a secret for seven years. When the federal government brought an antitrust suit against Hartford in 1939, the documents and records showing how the company had solicited him to claim authorship of the article and later paid him came out during discovery. Hazel, along with another of Hartford's competitors that had paid a substantial licensing fee, petitioned the Third Circuit for leave to refile its original claim with the district court; (Note: While Hazel has often been cited as instituting this requirement, it actually dates to In re Potts at the end of the 19th century. In 1976, the Court dispensed with it.) the judges decided that since the fraud had been perpetrated on the appellate court it should be the one to rehear the case.

In 1943 a divided Third Circuit held for Hartford. Judge Charles Alvin Jones wrote for the majority that both Hazel and Shawkee had had the knowledge to bring the fraud to the appeals court's attention nine years earlier, and that in any event the court had not relied to a great extent on the article; the only reference Hazel's attorneys made to it during the proceedings concerned a claim they accepted as true about the commercial success of gob feeding. It also believed it lacked the power to overturn the lower court even if it had agreed that the Clarke article was the decisive evidence in the 1932 court's reversal. Hazel and Shawkee were advised to attack the patent itself as the product of fraud in district court, Jones wrote: "It is in such an instance, i.e., where the question of alleged fraud in the procurement of a decree is placed squarely before a court having jurisdiction to hear and dispose of the matter, that the rule of United States v. Throckmorton ... and Marshall v. Holmes ... as to whether the alleged fraud is extrinsic or intrinsic, becomes germane." (Note: Jones also noted that the federal government, which had filed an amicus curiae brief in the case, could have the Patent Office reconsider the patent and annull it if it were found to have depended on the Clarke article.)

Judge John Biggs Jr., in dissent, disputed the majority's finding that the Clarke article had not had much of an impact on the 1932 decision; if it had not, he asked, why had Buffington quoted from it so liberally, and would he have done so if he had been aware of its true origins? It was misleading in a way that went straight to the point of the decision, which found no prior art behind gob feeding. "I think that Judge Buffington and this court were deceived in precisely the fashion that Hartford-Empire intended."

Nor did Biggs agree that Hazel and Shawkee had failed to do sufficient due diligence at the time. At trial they had no need to bring the article's origins up since Hartford had only submitted it then to demonstrate what the Patent Office had to consider, and when they began to investigate its origins after the appellate verdict Hartford's lawyers paid Clarke off so that he would not reveal the truth to Hazel's private investigators, a transaction only revealed years later. "If I am correct in my conclusions, Hazel-Atlas, lacking competent proof of the fraud, in its petition for rehearing would have had to have made serious charges against Hartford-Empire and three of its counsel basing its allegations on hearsay evidence which it had been unable to substantiate", Biggs wrote. "This is a course upon which a prudent litigant should and would embark with great reluctance."

===== Supreme Court =====
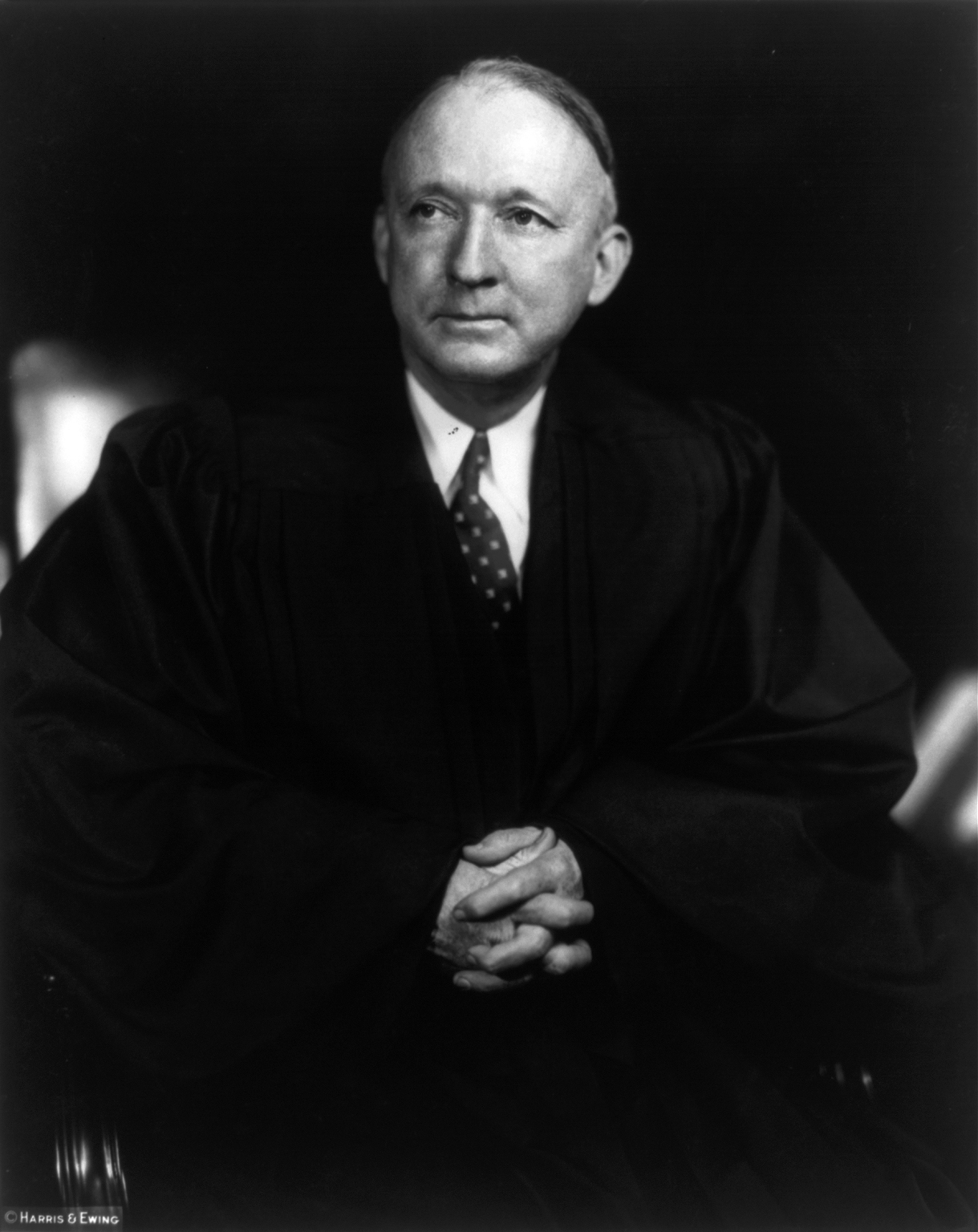
Justice Black

Hazel appealed to the Supreme Court, which decided the case in its favor almost a year later. "Every element of the fraud here disclosed demands the exercise of the historic power of equity to set aside fraudulently begotten judgments", Justice Hugo Black wrote for a five-justice majority. Citing both Throckmorton as establishing the general rule against disturbing old judgments with intrinsic fraud and Holmes as requiring an exception where the fraud was unconscionable, he took note of the sophisticated nature of the scheme and its successful execution against not only the Patent Office but the appeals court, based purely on the sworn testimony of Hartford's own lawyers.

Like Biggs, Black did not see that Hazel could have done anymore than it did at the time of the original case to find the fraud:

But even if Hazel did not exercise the highest degree of diligence, Hartford's fraud cannot be condoned for that reason alone ... Surely it cannot be that preservation of the integrity of the judicial process must always wait upon the diligence of litigants. The public welfare demands that the agencies of public justice be not so impotent that they must always be mute and helpless victims of deception and fraud.

Black conceded that it was impossible to assess the impact the Clarke article had had on the Third Circuit, but said that was beside the point as Hartford's lawyers had clearly meant for it to matter. And the Third Circuit did have the power, by hearing a petition to grant leave to reopen the claim in district court past the term of the original judgment.

"The total effect of all this fraud," Black concluded, "practiced both on the Patent Office and the courts, calls for nothing less than a complete denial of relief to Hartford for the claimed infringement of the patent thereby procured and enforced." The majority ordered the Third Circuit to not only vacate its 1932 holding and dismiss Hartford's appeal, but to instruct the district court to set aside its judgment based on that appeal and reinstate its original holding for Hazel that the patent was invalid. "To grant full protection to the public against a patent obtained by fraud, that patent must be vacated", Black concluded.

While he did not dispute that Hartford's attorneys had committed fraud on the court, Justice Owen Roberts's dissent criticized the majority's drastic response as exceeding the Court's constitutional powers. "We should not resort to a disorderly remedy, by disregarding the law as applied in federal courts ever since they were established, in order to reach one inequity at the risk of perpetrating another", he wrote. The Court should properly have only reversed the Third Circuit's decision and allowed for a new trial on the patent claim. That might not even be necessary if the government nullified the patent, as it had been able to do at any time since the truth of the Clarke article was exposed. The offending lawyers were subject to professional discipline.

Recalling Toledo Scale, Roberts believed that if Hazel had introduced the evidence it had even in 1932, such as an affidavit from its investigator as to how evasive Clarke was when questioned about the article, that would have been enough to reopen the case in district court and possible settle the question there. He further questioned Hazel's motivations for belatedly pursuing Hartford, noting that having ultimately profited from its licensing arrangement with Hartford it, too, was a defendant in the government's antitrust suit. Thus it was in Hazel's interest to "cast an anchor to windward" and put some distance between itself and Hartford.

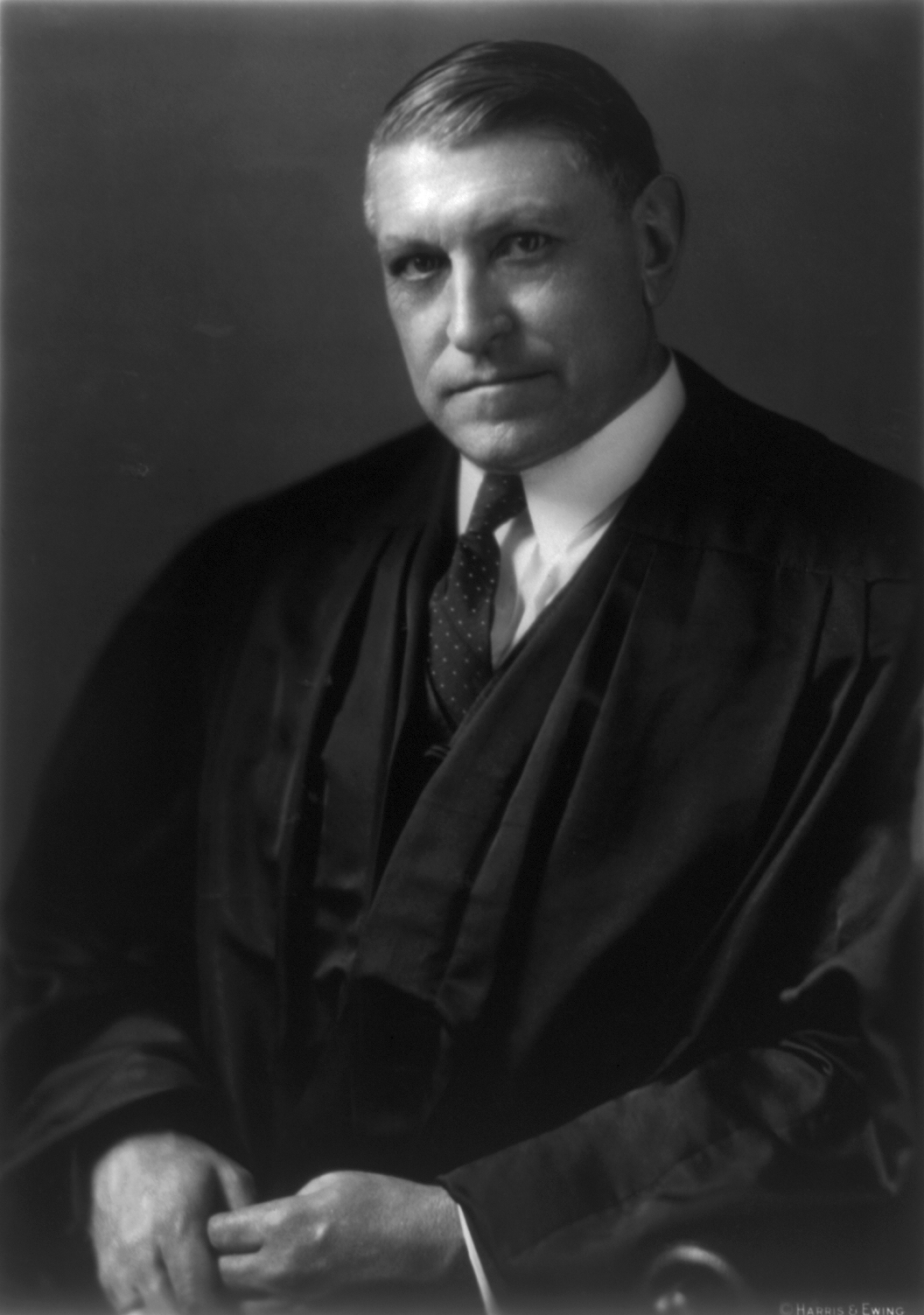
Justice Owen Roberts

In a footnote Roberts expounded on the intrinsic vs. extrinsic fraud distinction, referencing Throckmorton:

The distinction between extrinsic and intrinsic fraud is not technical but substantial. The statement that only extrinsic fraud may be the basis of a bill of review is merely a corollary of the rule that review will not be granted to permit relitigation of matters which were in issue in the cause and are, therefore, concluded by the judgment or decree. The classical example of intrinsic as contrasted with extrinsic fraud is the commission of perjury by a witness. While perjury is a fraud upon the court, the credibility of witnesses is in issue, for it is one of the matters on which the trier of fact must pass in order to reach a final judgment. An allegation that a witness perjured himself is insufficient because the materiality of the testimony, and opportunity to attack it, was open at the trial. Where the authenticity of a document relied on as part of a litigant's case is material to adjudication, as was the grant in the Throckmorton case, and there was opportunity to investigate this matter, fraud in the preparation of the document is not extrinsic but intrinsic and will not support review. Any fraud connected with the preparation of the Clarke article in this case was extrinsic, and, subject to other relevant rules, would support a bill of review.

=== Federal courts ===
==== Appellate courts ====
Several years apart during the 1930s, two different federal appellate circuits considered the unresolved tension between Throckmorton and Marshall, coming to opposite conclusions. The Supreme Court never heard either case, but courts have divided over whether it needs to choose between the two.

===== American Bakeries Co. v. Vining =====
In 1935 Judge Halsted L. Ritter of the Southern District of Florida considered American Bakeries Co. v. Vining, a bill of review brought before him by a company that had, after being held liable for injuries to an 18-month-old girl struck by one of its trucks, sought unsuccessfully to have the case reheard on the grounds that the girl's father had conspired to have several witnesses, including the first physician to attend her, perjure themselves at trial. (Note: After American Bakeries filed its petition, one of the witnesses, who had testified under oath to being an eyewitness, admitted in court that he had not actually been present at the time of the accident. Three days later, the girl's father, whom the company had identified as having entreated the perjury, took his own life, stating in his suicide note that he "had been framed in the courthouse", leaving him unavailable to testify.) The company had turned to federal court for equitable relief after losing at the Florida Supreme Court.

A month later, Ritter held for the defendant (the original plaintiff), finding the bakery guilty of laches. It had grounded its attack in Marshall, while Vining invoked Throckmorton in response. Since the Supreme Court had declined to use Graver to resolve the issue, he could consider both cases precedent and decide which one applied. After quoting both cases at length, he found Throckmorton more relevant to the instant case, as a clear case of intrinsic fraud. "[T]he fraud alleged in the bill here was presented to the state courts of competent jurisdiction," Ritter wrote, "and there heard and tried upon a voluminous taking of testimony before court commissioners".

American Bakeries appealed to the Fifth Circuit, which returned a decision by the end of the year. Judge Samuel Hale Sibley wrote for a unanimous panel that upheld the district court. "It is apparent that the facts testified to by the soi-disant eyewitnesses and by the physician ... were actually contested in the trial", he said. "The fraud and perjury were not so successful as to deceive the opposite party and prevent a contest."

While the respondents relied on Throckmorton to reinforce their case for intrinsic fraud, the petitioners "retort that a successful conspiracy by a plaintiff with his witnesses is more than a simple perjury or forgery, and ought, when discovered, always to be examinable as an extrinsic fraud when the conspiracy itself was not discovered and made an issue in the trial", as Sibley characterized their argument. He conceded that it was "shocking to judicial sensibility" that a verdict based on fraud could stand, but it was the lesser evil compared to the possibility of endless litigation based on fraud claims. "The law does not guarantee correctness of juridical fact-finding, but, on condition of diligence, a fair and full trial only."

===== Publicker v. Shallcross =====
Four years later, the Third Circuit took the opposite view. The petitioner in Publicker v. Shallcross had defaulted on his mortgage for a Philadelphia building, and after convincing the receivers that he was worth only $3,000, settled the $850,000 debt for a mere $8,500, paid by several of his friends. Three years later, the receivers discovered that he had greatly underrepresented his net worth at the time and successfully petitioned the district court to vacate the decision. Publicker appealed, seeing the case as purely a question of law, effectively admitting to the alleged misconduct but relying on Throckmorton to bar review.

"Appellant's position seems to be that, in his circumstance, wickedness, as well as virtue, is its own reward", wrote Judge William Clark. Publicker's brief relied heavily on Throckmorton, but "[w]e do not consider ourselves bound by that case for two, as we think, excellent reasons. We do not believe it applies to our circumstance and we do not believe it is the law of the Supreme Court today."

Clark pointed to Throckmorton's two legal maxims about the public interest in litigation ending, and double jeopardy. He then quoted from two Harvard Law Review articles criticizing that stance, on two grounds: that a judgment procured through fraud is inequitable no matter whether the other party could have exposed the fraud or not, and that any new claim alleging perjury or forgery must be supported by evidence. Another law review article pointed out that in Wisconsin, where the state supreme court rejected the Throckmorton rule, it had since heard only four cases seeking new trials on the ground of perjured evidence. Clark also noted that the risk of perjury in the instant case was higher as the hearing officer does not typically take an adversarial stance toward debtors and the receivers do not have the personal stake in the outcome that might motivate them to more fully investigate a debtor's claims about their financial situation.

Clark looked instead to Marshall, "a source of bewilderment" to lower courts since 1891, which Publicker's attorney had apparently been unaware of. He again quoted at length a Columbia Law Review article taking note of the "hazy region of uncertainty" between Throckmorton and Marshall, saying that as long as courts are free to pick and choose between them, "there will be no federal rule at all." Calling Marshall the "more salutary" of the two, Clark wrote for himself and his colleagues that the district court would be upheld as "[w]e believe truth is more important than the trouble it takes to get it."

Publicker petitioned the Supreme Court to hear the case, but it denied certiorari.

===== Josserand v. Taylor =====
Two years after Hazel-Atlas, the now-defunct Court of Customs and Patent Appeal (CCPA) (Note: Its jurisdiction is now part of the Federal Circuit Court of Appeals, created to replace the CCPA and other narrow-jurisdiction courts in 1982.) reaffirmed Throckmorton and rejected both Publicker's argument that Marshall overruled it and the argument that Hazel-Atlas had significantly modified it. In Josserand v. Taylor it considered the petition of Taylor, a previous patent litigant who had learned that testimony for Josserand about the viability of his claimed invention at an interference proceeding several years prior had been perjured. Judge Charles Sherrod Hatfield wrote for a five-judge panel that unanimously ruled for Josserand.

Taylor had argued both that Marshall had overruled Throckmorton, and if it had not then Hazel-Atlas definitely had, since it had explicitly disregarded the intrinsic-extrinsic distinction. First, Hatfield countered, the Hazel-Atlas Court had not expressed any opinion on the distinction, nor attempted to define the two terms. Second "we think it is clear from the decision in that case that the Court was of opinion that the fraud therein referred to was extrinsic or collateral to the issues finally determined by the Circuit Court of Appeals in that case."

Hatfield noted that the sentence in Hazel–Atlas citing both Throckmorton and Pickford, as well as the footnote to that sentence, citing cases including Publicker, "apparently has caused some confusion as to what the Court intended to be understood as holding in that case." But nothing in that footnote suggested any intent by the Court to overrule Throckmorton. Among the other cases cited was Chicago, Rock Island and Pacific Railway Co. v. Callicotte, in which the Eighth Circuit had found no conflict between Throckmorton and Marshall, Hatfield observed.

Hatfield concluded:

It would seem to be clear that if the majority of the Supreme Court, in the Hazel-Atlas Glass Co. case, had been of opinion that the fraud there held to have been perpetrated was intrinsic, and that there was a conflict between the decision in the Marshall v. Holmes and United States v. Throckmorton cases, supra, particularly in view of the circumstances hereinbefore related, it would have said so and would have expressly repudiated the rule announced in the Throckmorton case and followed by the Supreme Court and the Circuit Courts of Appeals in the cases hereinbefore cited. (In this connection it may be stated that although the case of Marshall v. Holmes was decided in 1891, many decisions of the Supreme Court, hereinbefore cited, reaffirming the rule in the Throckmorton case, were handed down long since the decision in the Marshall v. Holmes case. Accordingly, it is unnecessary for us to discuss the holding of the Supreme Court in that case.)

===== Other appellate court cases =====
Three years after Marshall, in United States v. Gleeson, the Second Circuit rejected the idea that it had in any way overruled Throckmorton. In denying a motion to vacate a naturalization obtained through alleged misrepresentation, Judge Emile Henry Lacombe noted that in another recent case which turned on the same issue, after the circuit had cited Throckmorton without writing an opinion to uphold the district court's denial of review, the appellant twice petitioned the Supreme Court for certiorari, both times with briefs citing the unresolved issues between the two cases, and was denied both times. "Until the attention of this court is called to some decision of the Supreme Court," Lacombe wrote, "other than Holmes v. Marshall, criticising or limiting the doctrine of U.S. v. Throckmorton, it would seem that the principle of stare decisis should preclude its entertaining a bill which seeks to vacate or annul a judgment solely on the ground that such judgment was procured by means of the perjured testimony of the party whom it benefits." (Note: Judge William James Wallace dissented, but did not write an opinion explaining why.)

In 1945, the Second Circuit took note of the "unsettled question" of the two cases when considering the petitioner's claims that a necessary stipulation in 1945's Griffith v. Bank of New York was obtained from her under duress. Relying on Marshall to hold that the district court could indeed grant equitable relief, Judge Charles Edward Clark noted that while Throckmorton had limited that power to cases of extrinsic fraud, "later cases no longer seem to adhere strictly to even this limitation". He cited specifically Publicker and Hazel-Atlas, but held the bank's duress to be extrinsic since it had prevented Griffith from fully and fairly presenting her case. (Note: In 1972 the Second Circuit reaffirmed that it read Throckmorton to exclude from reconsideration as intrinsic fraud most cases that simply alleged perjured testimony by a witness or two. This view is not universal in the Second Circuit; a decade later, Judge Richard J. Cardamone said in a dissent that he read Hazel-Atlas to have resolved the conflict in Marshall's favor.)

In 1942, three years after Publicker, the Fourth Circuit affirmed Throckmorton in Aetna Casualty & Surety Co. v. Abbott, citing Hilton v. Guyot and Toledo Scale as supporting precedent. Four decades later, it divided over the question of whether an employer's fabricated evidence, including false affidavits, of union violence during a strike a decade earlier, was intrinsic or extrinsic. The union had unsuccessfully likened the company's actions, which included instructing a nonunion employee to take a truck off the property and severely damage it, then file a false police report attributing the damage to striking workers, was similar enough to Hartford's planted article in Hazel-Atlas to warrant the same result. Taking note of the "debate regarding the effect of Marshall v. Holmes", visiting Judge Joe M. Ingraham of the Fifth Circuit wrote that the Fourth Circuit followed Throckmorton and thus held for the majority that "[p]erjury and fabricated evidence are evils that can and should be exposed at trial, and the legal system encourages and expects litigants to root them out as early as possible."

Dissenting judge John D. Butzner Jr. found too much resemblance to Hazel-Atlas to sustain the district court's verdict. That case, too, he noted, had been a settled matter for almost as long before the fraud was discovered, and while Black's opinion had referred to the conspirators behind it as officers of the court, not all were lawyers; the leader, who had written the purported Clarke article, was a "patent attorney", a term used at the time for a company's agent before the Patent Office, who was not himself a lawyer. And just as Hartford had deceived not only the Patent Office but the Third Circuit, the company in the instant case had deceived the courts and a federal agency, the National Labor Relations Board, which decertified the union partly due to the alleged violence.

Later Third Circuit cases maintained that per Publicker "in this circuit no significance is attached to the distinction, sometimes articulated in the caselaw, between intrinsic and extrinsic fraud." In 1986 the circuit's chief judge, John Joseph Gibbons, was particularly dismissive of that distinction, saying it "was overruled, if it was ever the law, by Marshall v. Holmes" and that it "probably would not in any event survive Erie Railroad v. Tompkins and Guaranty Trust Co. v. York, at least with respect to judgments in diversity cases." In a footnote Gibbons further characterized the distinction as "chimerical". (Note: In an earlier case, Schum v. Bailey, Gibbons had appended to his concurrence his entire draft opinion, which similarly noted that the Third Circuit, per Publicker, rejected the intrinsic-extrinsic distinction.)

The following year the Fifth Circuit had its say about the validity of Throckmorton's distinction in Browning v. Navarro, one of many federal and state cases to arise from a lengthy and contentious bankruptcy proceeding. Writing for a unanimous panel that reversed the district court only to allow the appellant to revisit a state court judgment he alleged to have been obtained through collusion with the judge, Judge E. Grady Jolly first considered the case in the light of Heiser v. Woodruff, the controlling precedent in bankruptcy law for when a federal court may allow a challenge to a state court's decision. But while that case had mentioned "judgments procured by fraud" as those from which equitable relief may be granted, it did not define fraud, so Jolly turned first to Throckmorton.

Jolly found the most relevant aspect of Throckmorton to have been the government's claim that Howard had been aware of the forged documents yet failed to inform the district court, and the lack of any evidence of either Howard's negligence or malfeasance. He found the elaborate scheme, and the involvement of officers of the court, in Hazel-Atlas, clarifying. "Hazel-Atlas is to be read as an expansion of the limits set by Throckmorton (Note: In a footnote, Jolly acknowledged the controversy between Throckmorton and Marshall, noting that the latter case may have "ignored, if not overruled, the distinction" between intrinsic and extrinsic fraud to the point that while Heiser does not consider it at all, Hazel-Atlas contemporaneously treats it as valid.) in attacking judgments generally, but not as granting other courts as broad a power to question judgments as Heiser grants bankruptcy courts", Jolly wrote. "Hazel-Atlas allows a judgment to be attacked on the basis of intrinsic fraud that results from corrupt conduct by officers of the court."

==== District courts ====
===== Thomas v. Hunter =====
Tenth Circuit judge Walter A. Huxman, sitting a case in the District of Kansas, relied on Throckmorton to free a prisoner. The petitioner, Thomas, previously arrested and convicted on charges of transporting stolen automobiles across state lines, sought a writ of habeas corpus after being arrested in Missouri on the same charge as well as violating his parole. Among the allegations in his petition was that his attorney, Dyer, had not been present when the jury in the second case returned its verdict, denying him the effective assistance of counsel.

Dyer had testified at an earlier coram nobis hearing that he had been present for the verdict. He was not present to testify at the habeas hearing, so the transcript of the earlier hearing was introduced, but Thomas attacked it as hearsay, so it was excluded, and the government offered no other evidence to rebut him. Thomas's petition was granted and he was released.

Within the ten-day deadline provided to file for a rehearing, the government did so, offering sworn affidavits from the U.S. Attorney and his assistant, who had been present. Its petition was granted and with the new evidence at the rehearing, Thomas was ordered returned to prison, a decision upheld on appeal. He filed the instant habeas petition, arguing not only his original case but that the rehearing should never have been granted as the prosecutors had had a fair chance to discredit his testimony as to Dyer's presence and thus that issue was res judicata.

The evidence offered to support Dyer's presence at the verdict was not conclusive: the attorney had gone back to his office when the jury retired, and one of the prosecutors had said in an earlier letter that he could not recall whether Dyer was present. But Huxman wrote that if Thomas's account were assumed arguendo to be false, Throckmorton was "the leading case on the subject ... [even if] somewhat weaken[ed]" by Hazel-Atlas. "Even if we assume that Thomas was guilty of fraud," Huxman wrote, "it was not extrinsic fraud. His fraud certainly did not deceive the respondent or prevent him from fairly presenting his case because he had facts in his possession at that time which he subsequently used to obtain a modification of the judgment."

===== In re de Banati =====
In 1972 the District of Puerto Rico weighed in on the Throckmorton–Marshall relationship. Judge José Victor Toledo held in In re de Banati that the latter case "seems not to have gone as far as the debtor believes" since it only applied when relief at law was not available. "Furthermore, [Marshall] can only be read in the context of the procedural aspect of removal to a federal court, which circumstance may have justified Mr. Justice Harlan's language and his overpassing Throckmorton sub silentio."

=== State courts ===
==== Ward v. Town of Southfield ====
In 1886, eight years after Throckmorton and before Marshall, the New York Court of Appeals, that state's highest court, became the first state court of record to consider the intrinsic/extrinsic distinction with Ward v. Town of Southfield. The petitioner, tax collector in the village of Edgewater, part of the Town of Southfield (both now defunct and absorbed into New York City) in Richmond County (coterminous with Staten Island), had been successfully sued by the town for $4,000 in uncollected taxes in 1872, out of a roll of $66,000. Only after paying the judgment did Ward discover that the assessors' affidavit attached to the roll was so defective that there was no legal authority to collect any taxes. Ward sued to set the judgment aside and get his money back; after the town prevailed he appealed.

Judge Robert Earl held for a unanimous court in favor of the town. The warrant to collect the taxes, which did not have the affidavit attached (Ward's original defense in the suit), was properly executed and would not have been a basis for questioning the legality of the tax collection. None of the taxpayers Ward collected from expressed any doubt as to their legality or refused to pay on those grounds. And had he collected all the taxes, Ward noted, there would have been no grounds for suit against him, regardless of the affidavit.

Relying in part on Throckmorton, Earl distinguished those cases where relief might be granted:

It is not sufficient merely to raise a suspicion or to show what is sometimes called constructive fraud, but there must be actual fraud. There must be by one party a false and fraudulent representation, or a fraudulent affirmative act, or a fraudulent concealment of a fact for the purpose of obtaining an undue and an unjust advantage of the other party and procuring an unjust and unconscionable judgment. It is not practicable nor possible to formulate a rule on this subject which will be sufficient to solve all cases; but where fraudulent concealment of a fact is relied upon for the purpose of impeaching and setting aside a judgment regularly obtained, it must be an intentional concealment of a material and controlling fact for the purpose of misleading and taking an undue advantage of the opposite party. It would not be wise or politic to carry the rule so far as to make it incumbent upon every plaintiff to reveal to the defendant any infirmity in his case, and to require every defendant to reveal to the plaintiff every infirmity "in his defense." Where there is no relation of confidence between the plaintiff and the defendant the parties stand at arm's length. They come into court as adversaries, and neither party is bound to make any revelation of his case to the other. The plaintiff must be prepared to prove all the facts constituting his cause of action and to meet any defense which the defendant may interpose; and the defendant must be prepared to establish any defense which he may have. Neither party can mislead the other by any positive or actual fraud. Nor can he, for the purpose of perpetrating a fraud upon the other party, conceal such facts as good faith and common honesty require him to reveal.

A decade later Judge Woods quoted this passage when the Seventh Circuit made its first attempt to reconcile Throckmorton and Marshall in Graver.

==== Pico v. Cohn ====
Five years after Ward, the California Courts of Appeal became the first state court to formally adopt Throckmorton in Pico v. Cohn, resulting in the two often being cited together as authorities on the fraud on the court issue. Pico was the petitioner's effort to have a judgment that a sale of property to him was in fact a mortgage and thus the respondent was entitled to repossess it for nonpayment set aside after he discovered that a key witness whose testimony he had expected to support his claim but did not had been bribed by the respondent on the morning of the trial. Writing for an en banc court, Chief Justice William H. Beatty held that since the petitioner had suspected the bribery but had no evidence, and the court chose to believe the resultant perjured testimony, it was intrinsic fraud under Throckmorton and the case was unreviewable. "[W]e think it is settled beyond controversy that a decree will not be vacated merely because it was obtained by forged documents or perjured testimony."

The use of bribery to induce the perjury did not make the fraud extrinsic, Beatty continued, since while the money had changed hands outside of the courtroom the practical effect was within, during the proceedings. He agreed that the wrong was "most grievous" but said that it was for the legislature to address it in a way that would not give rise to endless litigation "in which nothing was ever finally determined, [which] would be worse than occasional miscarriages of justice." A litigant at trial:

... must be prepared to meet and expose perjury then and there. He knows that a false claim or defense can be supported in no other way; that the very object of the trial is, if possible, to ascertain the truth from the conflict of the evidence, and that, necessarily, the truth or falsity of the testimony must be determined in deciding the issue. The trial is his opportunity for making the truth appear.

The court did not find any distinction between the instant case and Throckmorton, and noted also other state cases supporting it.

==== Maryland Steel Co. v. Marney ====
At the turn of the century the Maryland Court of Appeals, also that state's highest court, accepted Throckmorton as controlling in Maryland Steel Co. v. Marney. The petitioner had sought to vacate a judgment several years earlier in favor of one of its employees blinded in an accident after learning that the employee had conspired with several former coworkers to testify that they were present at the time of the accident when they were in fact elsewhere. Judge Andrew Hunter Boyd wrote for a unanimous court affirming lower-court rulings in favor of the employee, on the grounds that the company could have easily discovered the truth before trial and confronted Marney and his witnesses with it but did not. He later discussed at some length the distinctions, or lack thereof, between the different types of fraud.

Boyd cited Throckmorton and Pico, which he found "very similar to this case in many respects", quoting extensively from both, (Note: "The great weight of authority is as stated in the cases of Pico v. Cohn and United States v. Throckmorton, supra, and the reasoning of those opinions, especially the portions we have italicised, is so in accord with our views and so satisfactory, we adopt their language instead of attempting to make it clearer by anything we might say why such rule should prevail.") in opposition to the prospect of endless litigation. "[T]here is perhaps no infamous crime more frequently attributed to others than that of perjury", he wrote. "The losing party to a cause is too frequently ready to attribute his defeat to the false swearing of witnesses, and the frame of mind he is in, under such circumstances, easily enables him to reach the conclusion that his opponent has procured such false testimony by means of money or other unlawful inducement." Therefore, the petitioner was required to support that claim with strong evidence.

Boyd took the position that situations like the one in Pico and the instant case in which an opposing party was accused not merely of perjury but suborning that of others, where the defeated party was otherwise reasonably able to have discovered this at the time of the trial. "In the first place, witnesses are not apt to commit perjury against the wish of the party calling them and they, as a rule, perhaps do not do so without some expected compensation" he wrote. "It may not be money, but if it is to obtain the favor or the good will of a litigant, although he pays them no money, it is just as reprehensible as if the consideration was a pecuniary one." Boyd allowed that an exception might exist where a party or witness had been convicted of perjury in the original trial, as that would be a bar to continued litigation, but that was not an issue in the case at bar, so the court did not need to decide it.

===== Schwartz v. Merchants Mortgage Co. =====
In 1974 the Schwartzes, alleging a conspiracy among the respondents, asked the Court of Appeals to reconsider Maryland Steel and how the Throckmorton rule, as adopted then, might be affected by Marshall, citing specifically Shammas. Judge J. Dudley Digges wrote for another unanimous court, citing the principle of stare decisis:

Our response to these contentions, however, is quite simple. The law of Maryland is too well settled for us to overrule it in a decision such as this. Whether Marshall modified Throckmorton is irrelevant here, since even if it did, all of the decisions of this Court [since then] have consistently adopted Throckmorton as correctly expressing the law of this state with no mention of Marshall at all. Surely, our predecessors were aware of that case but chose to ignore it. This reasoning is equally applicable to the argument in favor of abolishing the distinction between intrinsic and extrinsic fraud. At least seventy-four years of case law cannot be swept aside with such a broad and bold stroke.

==== Boring v. Ott ====
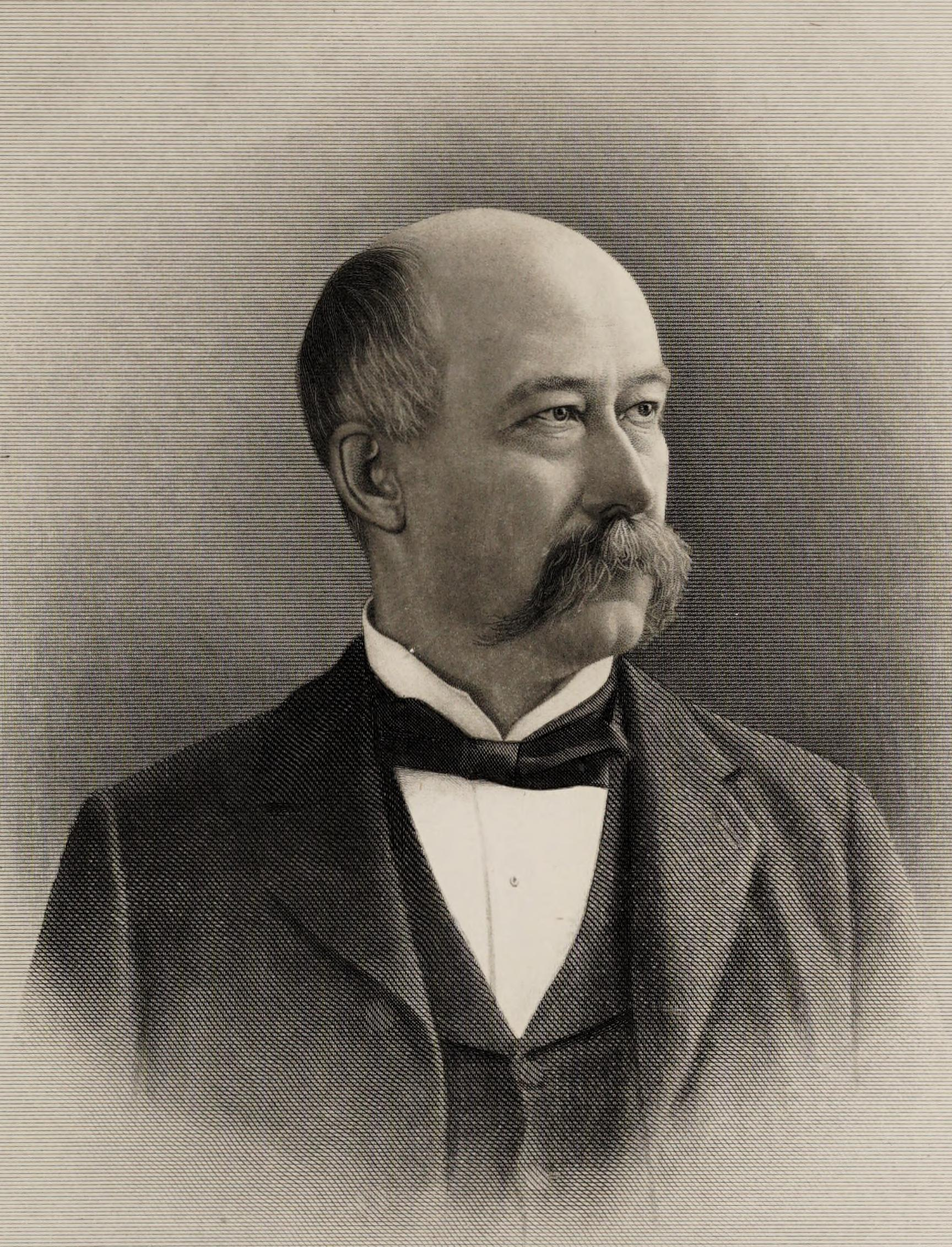
Justice James Kerwin

In 1909 the Wisconsin Supreme Court became the first court to reject the rigidity of Throckmorton in Boring v. Ott. The case had been brought by Boring, the executor of an estate, 17 years after discovering that the respondent had allegedly misrepresented an agreement with the decedent, Pool, which he claimed gave him the right to inherit a quarter share of the decedent's store as in force when it had actually been rescinded. Boring sought to have Ott enjoined from further enforcement of the judgment. Justice James C. Kerwin wrote for the majority, suggesting while Throckmorton' was generally good law it could stand to be broadened.

Throckmorton had, as a necessity of articulating a rule, not defined extrinsic fraud very clearly, Kerwin observed.; he also took note of Marshall as having modified the rule. For that reason, "it is not easy to see why an issue determined solely by the perjury of the prevailing party does not amount to such a fraud, where such perjury was unknown to the defeated party, and could not by the exercise of reasonable diligence have been discovered," he wrote. "It would seem that a judgment thus obtained is as unconscionable as one secured by keeping a party away from court or by other corrupt means, and thereby preventing a fair trial on the merits."

So, having held that Throckmorton would not bar the court from considering the motion as a matter of law, Kerwin considered the facts, which he found wanting, not up to the standards set by Tovey and other precedents. Ott had consistently denied the alleged perjury, and the circumstantial evidence suggested that the agreement had indeed been in force at the time of Pool's death. "There is not sufficient evidence to make out a case for the plaintiff to that high degree of proof required by the authorities."

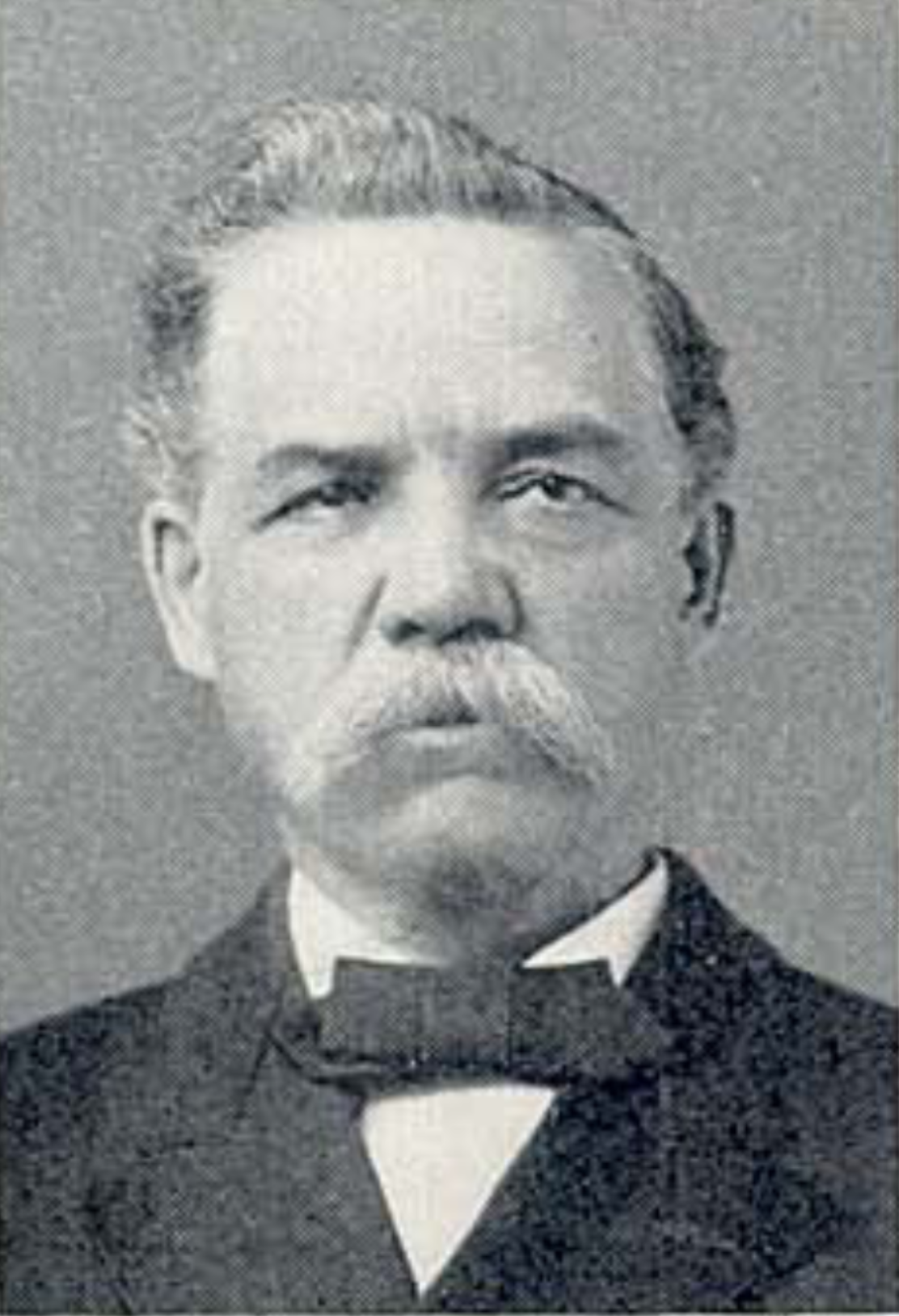
Justice Roujet D. Marshall

The lone dissenter, Justice Roujet D. Marshall, would also have denied relief, but because he believed Throckmorton to be good law. Marshall, he wrote, "bears all the earmarks of having been decided without full appreciation of the situation the [C]ourt had created." If the Court had considered Throckmorton at all, Marshall speculated, it was to decide that the use of forged documents to secure the peitioner's signature on a contract was extrinsic fraud and thus fit for relief. In support of that proposition, Marshall argued that "in many cases decided since 1891 ... the Throckmorton rule is found vindicated in all its integrity".

==== Alexander v. Hagedorn ====
The Texas Supreme Court's 1950 Alexander v. Hagedorn decision has been criticized by both its dissent and outside commentary as an unduly harsh and rigid application of Throckmorton, since it held as intrinsic fraud a false unsworn statement that had the effect of denying the defendant in the original lawsuit his day in court. It began when the petitioners, a married couple, swerved off a rural road into a ditch one night to avoid colliding with a mule that they testified later as one they recognized as being owned by respondent. Since it was a violation of local law to allow livestock to wander onto roads, they sued over the damage to their car and injuries to Mrs. Alexander.

When the deputy sheriff served Hagedorn, an immigrant who could speak English but not read or write it, Hagedorn asked the deputy to tell him what the papers said. He then appeared at court on the designated day, only to find it was not in session. He asked the clerk when it would be, and the clerk asked Hagedorn if he had retained an attorney; Hagedorn answered that he had not. Hagedorn gave the clerk his address and asked the clerk to notify him when the case would be heard.

Hagedorn did not hear from the court again. Seven months later he learned that his bank account had been garnished to satisfy a default judgment the Alexanders had obtained against four months earlier. At that proceeding, the Alexanders had told the judge, unsworn that they knew the mule belonged to Hagedorn; in reality, it belonged to Hagedorn's son and they were aware of this at that time. Hagedorn then hired a lawyer and brought the action to set it aside, providing proof that his son owned the mule and prevailing both at trial and on appeal. The trial judge testified that had he known the mule's true ownership he would not have granted default judgment.

Writing for a majority of six, Justice Few Brewster found first that the trial court clerk's negligence was legally attributable to Hagedorn, since by asking the clerk to let him know when the trial would be, a task outside the scope of the clerk's statutory duties, he had made the clerk his agent. Since this negligence was thus legally Hagedorn's own, he could not claim any action by the Alexanders had prevented him from offering his defense in court and thus under Throckmorton, Pico and other cases in that line, it was intrinsic fraud and the appeals court was reversed.

Justice Graham B. Smedley dissented, joined by William M. Taylor. "[T]he wrongful act of petitioner was a false statement made to the district judge for the purpose of inducing him to hold the hearing in the absence of respondent Hagedorn," he wrote. "It did induce the district judge to proceed, and but for that statement no hearing would have been held and no judgment would have been rendered. It is very clear that petitioner's statement was extrinsic rather than intrinsic fraud." Ruling it intrinsic "is an unnecessary straining in support of an inequitable and unjust judgment", Smedley proclaimed.

Given Hagedorn's difficulties with the language, "he could not be expected to anticipate that the case would be heard without notice to him and a judgment rendered against him for damages in a very substantial amount for which he was in no way liable", Smedley argued. Thus the negligence standard he was held to was too strict. "[He] was diligent to the extent of his capacity, understanding and information."

==== Bryan v. Bryan ====
In 1951 the South Carolina Supreme Court considered the intrinsic-extrinsic distinction as a question of first impression under state law in Bryan v. Bryan, where the petitioner sought a new trial on the grounds that he had only learned after an earlier judgment against him that damaging testimony by the plaintiffs' witnesses had been perjured. Justice George Dewey Oxner looked to federal authorities, citing Throckmorton as "one of the leading cases. He acknowledged Publicker's criticisms, but believed Roberts's footnote in his Hazel-Atlas dissent served to address them. Further, he noted that the Fourth Circuit, which includes South Carolina, had accepted Throckmorton in Aetna.

There had been an earlier case where the court had reversed a lower court and allowed retrial in a case where a plaintiff suing a railroad for collision damage to his car had testified to having paid more for it than the dealer swore to after the trial. But that had resulted from confusion on the plaintiff's part, which mooted the question of the defendant's due diligence. Oxner distinguished the instant case by noting that the petitioner, as defendant, had known before trial who the witnesses against him were and what they would be testifying to, affording him ample opportunity to attack their credibility and materiality at the time. By failing to do his due diligence then, he forfeited his opportunity to enjoin the enforcement of the judgment.

==== Shammas v. Shammas ====
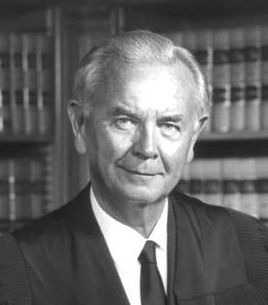
Justice William J. Brennan Jr.

New Jersey's Supreme Court decided to reject the distinction between intrinsic and extrinsic fraud in 1952's Shammas v. Shammas, where a woman sought to have her divorce set aside on the grounds that her husband had falsely denied under oath an overseas marriage he entered into before the divorce became final. Writing for a six-justice majority, future U.S. Supreme Court justice William J. Brennan Jr., said it was "not clear" whether Throckmorton applied in federal courts. He took note of the opinion that Marshall may have overruled it, but Hazel-Atlas had cited both without resolving the issue. Brennan announced that New Jersey's courts would go further than Federal Rule 60(b) in allowing equitable relief for either intrinsic or extrinsic fraud, as long as it could be well-supported, without any time limit:

The notion that repeated retrials of cases may be expected to follow the setting aside of judgments rendered on false testimony will not withstand critical analysis. Rather it is more logical to anticipate that the guilty litigant committing or suborning testimony will not risk pursuing the cause further. And, in any event, a court may not set aside a final judgment merely because some testimony is perjured. All perjury is an affront to the dignity of the court and to the integrity of the judicial process, but the law is not without other effective means to punish the perpetrator of the crime. Perjured testimony that warrants disturbance of a final judgment must be shown by clear, convincing and satisfactory evidence to have been, not false merely, but to have been willfully and purposely falsely given, and to have been material to the issue tried and not merely cumulative but probably to have controlled the result. Further, a party seeking to be relieved from the judgment must show that the fact of the falsity of the testimony could not have been discovered by reasonable diligence in time to offset it at the trial or that for other good reason the failure to use diligence is in all the circumstances not a bar to relief. Clearly, the necessity to satisfy these tests before the judgment may be disturbed is itself a deterrent to repeated litigation of the same factual issues. ... Plainly, the encouragement of vexatious litigation is the lesser evil. We prefer to follow the equity of the matter and to take away an unjust judgment obtained by vital perjury when the injustice and inequity of allowing it to stand are made evident. (Note: Dissenting justice Harry Heher did not write an opinion.)

==== St. Pierre v. Edmonds ====
In 1982 the Utah Supreme Court joined Wisconsin and New Jersey in explicitly rejecting Throckmorton. In St. Pierre v. Edmonds it considered a woman's petition to have her divorce settlement set aside on the grounds that her former husband had obtained her signatures on key paperwork through intimidation. Justice I. Daniel Stewart wrote for a unanimous panel of four (Christine M. Durham did not participate), that "The well established and fundamental doctrines designed to establish the stability of judgments and decrees must yield to the overriding principle that in our system of justice the essential integrity of the adjudicatory process must be preserved. One who would destroy that integrity cannot plead as a defense that his fraud on the system of justice must be protected in the name of preserving judgments."

Stewart discussed Throckmorton and Marshall without saying which was controlling in the case at bar. He considered the distinction between the two types of fraud to have "little merit ... [It] fails to provide a rational basis for the harsh legal consequences which flow from it.". While acknowledging that many courts considered the former case to still be good law, he announced that Utah would join the courts that had, citing Boring and Publicker.

==== Facey v. Facey ====
In 2021, the Maryland Court of Special Appeals went to great length to distinguish intrinsic and extrinsic fraud under Throckmorton in Facey v. Facey, in which relief was sought over an allegedly forged signature on a power of attorney document. Even as she reaffirmed that the state's courts had always followed Throckmorton, Judge Andrea Leahy acknowledged the "consternation surrounding the distinction" as she reiterated that case and reviewed more than a century of state precedent.

Extrinsic fraud "perpetrates an abuse of judicial process by preventing an adversarial trial and/or impacting the jurisdiction of the court [and] ... is normally collateral to the issues tried in the case in which the judgment is rendered", Leahy concluded. Intrinsic fraud, on the other hand, "relates to facts that were before the court in the original suit and could have been raised or exposed at the trial level." On that basis she concluded that the power of attorney at issue in the case was correctly found to be intrinsic fraud by the trial court and thus not reviewable.

==== Other state court cases ====
In 1949, the New Hampshire Supreme Court held that the distinction between intrinsic and extrinsic fraud did not matter in divorce cases as that area of law "is governed by general equitable considerations."

The California Courts of Appeal took note of the dissonance between Throckmorton and Marshall when deciding Smith v. Great Lakes Airlines Inc. in 1966. The petitioners sought to enjoin enforcement of a judgment against them obtained by the respondents, who had leased an airplane from them with an option to buy, alleging that the respondents had conspired with government regulators to mislead the court into believing that because of the petitioners' failure to provide adequate maintenance records for the plane within the stipulated time, the respondents had had to perform a required airframe overhaul themselves, at great cost. Judge Otto Kaus affirmed Throckmorton as the law of the state, noting other state cases following it, at the same time as there was "a certain amount of confusion" in the federal courts. He, too, acknowledged Publicker, but declined to follow its lead. "As far as we can determine Marshall v. Holmes has never even been cited in California, let alone followed", Kaus wrote, holding for the respondents.

In 1991 the Oklahoma Supreme Court came down on the side of Throckmorton when granting a physician's request that a judgment against her in a suit she brought over her dismissal from a hospital be vacated due to misrepresentations made during the proceedings by hospital executives. "This court has adopted the essence of the Throckmorton definitions of extrinsic and intrinsic fraud", wrote Justice Marian P. Opala. "[But w]hile the definitions are fairly simple and straightforward, their application has often been somewhat hazy" and thus none of the state cases the hospital cited were enough to prevent the court from siding with the doctor. (Note: A dissenting justice, Robert D. Simms, believed that the physician had not exercised sufficient due diligence at trial to justify the court's ruling in her favor.) In a footnote Opala noted the conflict with Marshall, and called it unresolved.

=== Australian courts ===
The Federal Court of Australia's South Australia district described Throckmorton as "still regarded in the United States as the leading authority" on the fraud issue in 1992, when it considered in Monroe Schneider Associates v No. 1 Raberem Pty. Ltd. the claim by an appellant that the appellee had actively suborned perjury from a witness at trial. While the court cited Black's distinction in Hazel-Atlas of the involvement of officers of the court in the fraud as a reason to consider the allegation, it found the evidence insufficient to merit setting aside the original judgment.

In a 2003 case, Modric v Srisawat, the District Court of Queensland considered an allegation by one driver whose vehicle had been damaged in an accident several years earlier that the alleged driver of the other vehicle and her husband had perjured themselves at trial when they claimed she had not been the driver involved in the accident. He sought to set aside the original judgment in favor of her and her insurer on grounds of fraud. Judge Alan Wilson held for the defendants that while the evidence of the alleged perjury could not have been uncovered through due diligence at trial, the plaintiff's own account of the accident was not credible enough to make it unambiguous that the defendant was the other driver. In support, he cited Throckmorton and quoted the same passage from Tovey v Young, as well as Hazel-Atlas.

== Analysis and commentary ==
=== Early 20th century ===
Criticism of Throckmorton dates to the early 20th century. In 1909 the Harvard Law Review carried the unsigned commentary that Judge Clark quoted from extensively in Publicker. The writer addressed the case's underpinnings in its goal of making sure that litigation eventually came to an end. He argued that the distinction between intrinsic and extrinsic fraud mattered less than the fact of a litigant being cheated of a fair trial, and that any litigant alleging fraud had to come to court ready to prove it. "With these safeguards against undue litigation the lesser evil is to follow the equity of the matter." But in a 1916 survey of courts throughout the U.S., Britain and Canada regarding fraud-based attacks on judgments in the University of Pennsylvania Law Review, Graham Woodward called Throckmorton "particularly well considered and worthy of the most careful thought".

Judge Clark also cited a 1921 commentary in the Columbia Law Review that was among the first to note the conflict between Throckmorton and Marshall: "The Supreme Court of the United States, to show its utter impartiality, has ruled both ways, and left the spectacle of two cases, one of which holds that false evidence is ground for reversal, the other that it is not, both of which have been followed, and neither of which has been overruled." The writer advocated for a firmer rule grounded in the interest of deterring overlong litigation. "Should an indefinite amount of litigation be permitted for the sake of securing questionable advantages to a very small number of litigants?" But as long as this debate remained unsettled, "the only possible answer in spite of repeated assertions that the federal rule is clear, is that there is no federal rule at all. And there will be none until one or the other of the conflicting decisions is overruled."

=== Later 20th century ===
In the mid-20th century, Hazel-Atlas and the 1946 amendments to Rule 60(b), under which the intrinsic/extrinsic distinction does not apply to judgments within a certain time frame (six months at that time, a year now), drew fresh commentary. "The present weight of Throckmorton would perhaps not be as great", a 1951 Vanderbilt Law Review article observed, "if the courts were to consider the procedural differences existing at that time." The writer, Harold C. Dedman, noted that the equitable relief that was the only remedy available in the late 1870s has since largely been supplanted by legislation specifying more clearly the situations in which new trials may be granted.

"It has caused much embarrassment to courts which give it token recognition," so they have found ways to reclassify fraud as extrinsic to get around it, Dedman added. Most commonly, they had relied on a fiduciary or other relationship between the parties to do so. At the same time, "some courts have shown by their inner turmoil that the harshness of the rule is recognized, and yet go very far to sustain it."

But Dedman noted that English courts have never drawn the same distinction. And in Wisconsin, Boring had not been complemented with any state equivalent of Rule 60(b), yet did not "seem to be encouraging excessive and endless litigation." He speculated that perhaps the high burden of proof required for fraud in the state might have an effect.

Dedman dismissed the idea that Rule 60(b) had overruled Throckmorton; instead it had merely given any party alleging intrinsic fraud a year after the judgment to make their claim. Nor did Marshall displace the earlier holding; according to Dedman it had not made a direct holding and only suggested the possibility of relief through unconscionability. "Its validity is doubtful", he said of the distinction. But "[b]y adverting to the procedural aspects of the cases originally establishing the rule, it is possible to distinguish them." He expected courts to continue expanding the definition of extrinsic fraud, but suggested a rule change eliminating the distinction and providing that "the objection that a judgment would never be final does not apply" when equitable relief is sought before the same court which originally pronounced judgment.

The following year, Dean Wagner, a Duke law student, considered the relationship between Throckmorton and Marshall in the wake of Hazel-Atlas and the new language of Rule 60(b), which the drafters of the latter had indicated in their notes was prompted by that decision, in his university's law review. In Hazel-Atlas, he argued, the Court had carved out an exception to Throckmorton and yet implicitly prodded lower courts to adhere more strictly to it, so it was not surprising that they had continued to choose whichever precedent suited them. But the CCPA's holding in Josserand had come down squarely against reading Hazel-Atlas as holding that Marshall limited Throckmorton in any way. "This decision is important," he said, "for if the court's interpretation of the Hartford case is correct the new Federal Rule becomes merely a re-statement of the old Throckmorton rule."

Wagner noted the contrary influences on the courts in two cases of the D.C. Circuit. In a 1951 probate case it had affirmed the district court's denial of a petition to set aside the acceptance of a will on the grounds that it had been procured by fraud and perjury. Judge Bennett Champ Clark's opinion held that the alleged misrepresentation was unreviewable intrinsic fraud that the petitioners had raised but not prevailed on at trial; he stated explicitly in considering the applicability of Rule 60(b) that Josserand had held that Hazel-Atlas did not in any way change Throckmorton. Yet a year later, in setting aside a divorce on the grounds that the wife had misrepresented her fidelity and financial situation under oath at trial, Judge Henry White Edgerton, writing for a panel that included Clark, again cited Hazel-Atlas in holding that that Rule 60(b) did not limit the power of a court to "at any time set aside a judgment for after-discovered fraud upon the court."

In Shammas, the New Jersey Supreme Court had gone further than its federal counterpart and "attached a definite understanding to the meaning of [fraud on the court]", Wagner wrote. He proposed that the distinction between what fraud was reviewable and what was not, and the greater issue of the balance between not allowing endless litigation and not allowing frauds to go unremedied, lie not on whether it took place within the action but on the moving party's due diligence during the original action.

If in the opinion of a court a judgment was obtained through the utilization of false records and documents of which a party was justifiably unaware, then the judgment should be set aside, regardless of the fact that the fraud was intrinsic. On the other hand, if a party could have known of the fraud, and had a thorough opportunity to investigate the matter and through his own fault an adverse judgment was rendered, no relief should be available

Wagner argued that Hazel-Atlas indicated at the very least an intention to broaden the scope of Throckmorton; in his opinion, it had applied Marshall. And "[u]ntil the Supreme Court redefines its position the "manifestly unconscionable" test will be the only test, and it will remain, as it has been, that despite Federal Rule 60(b) there is no federal rule at all."

Two widely-cited books on federal civil procedure have also criticized the lack of clarity from the Supreme Court on whether Throckmorton or Marshall controls, and the ensuing difficulty of distinguishing intrinsic and extrinsic fraud. Charles Alan Wright and Arthur R. Miller's 55-volume Federal Practice and Procedure calls the authorities "clouded and confused" and notes that there seem to be three results: " some lower courts appl[y] the Throckmorton rule, others [give] it `token recognition,' and others reject[] it altogether." The Moore's Federal Practice series repeats its author's Yale Law Journal observations from shortly after Hazel-Atlas that "at times it is a journey into futility to attempt a distinction between extrinsic and intrinsic matter", citing Callicotte as an example:

Few will question the justice of granting relief to the railroad from Callicotte's de luxe reinforced perjury, but the judgment was no more fraudulent than any that results from successful perjury. Accordingly, it seems that little is to be gained by classifying successful fraud into intrinsic and extrinsic categories ...

He suggested instead that courts focus on how extensive the fraud was and the alleging party's due diligence.

=== 21st century ===
In 2011 Texas Tech law professor Dustin Benham wrote that the Supreme Court's recent decisions in Bell Atlantic Corp. v. Twombly and Ashcroft v. Iqbal could allow for the elimination of the intrinsic-extrinsic distinction through heightened standards for the pleading of fraud. The two cases were seen as overruling the 1957 Conley v. Gibson holding that litigants asking for relief from an earlier decision on grounds of fraud, mistake or other irregularity needed only to show that the alleged irregularity was conceivable, and replacing it with plausibility as the standard.

Benham saw Throckmorton as a well-intended decision that was born of a time, the common law pleading era, when it was easy for unscrupulous unsuccessful litigants to fabricate allegations of perjury and forgery, thus the Court's bar on actions alleging intrinsic fraud. "But the distinction was difficult to apply from the beginning and became less practical and equitable as the decades passed," he wrote, as the categories became magnified in the code pleading and modern notice pleading eras, a development he attributed to the low standards under Conley. Benham said it was time to abolish the distinction as conceptually flawed, inconsistently applied, and unnecessary under Twombly and Iqbal.

== Use by supporters of Donald Trump's attempt to overturn 2020 presidential election results ==
In 2021, supporters of former U.S. president Donald Trump who believed his defeat by Joseph Biden in the previous year's election had been the result of widespread voter fraud in several states brought lawsuits in those states in an attempt to have the election result overturned. On social media, they cited Throckmorton, quoting the line "Fraud vitiates everything" from the decision, reading it to mean that if it could be proven that even one state's results were so tainted by fraud as to be unreliable, the entire election was void.

Sidney Powell, Lin Wood and several other lawyers representing voters who had supported Trump cited Throckmorton in a case they brought in the Eastern District of Michigan against Democratic governor Gretchen Whitmer. The city of Detroit, the Democratic National Committee and other parties joined as intervenors for her defense. In her final opinion in 2021, among other criticisms of the plaintiffs' case and attorneys (all of whom she recommended professional sanctions against for bringing a frivolous case), Judge Linda Parker briefly addressed their use of Throckmorton.

"Plaintiffs' counsel's citation to Throckmorton is puzzling," Parker wrote, "both because the case relates to a nineteenth-century land grant and has nothing to do with election law and because the Supreme Court held that the grant could not be collaterally attacked on the basis that the judgment was procured by fraud." She saw their attempt to introduce it as proof that the case was "driven by partisan political posturing, entirely disconnected from the law ... the dangerous product of an online feedback loop, with these attorneys citing 'legal precedent' derived not from a serious analysis of case law, but from the rantings of conspiracy theorists sharing amateur analysis and legal fantasy in their social media echo chambers."

Throckmorton had nothing to do with election law and could not be applied in that context, Parker reiterated. The "fraud vitiates everything" phrase they had fixated on was from a legal treatise Justice Miller was quoting from, and not part of the opinion itself. Most importantly, in Throckmorton the Court had declined to follow that maxim.

== See also ==
- 1878 in the United States
- List of United States Supreme Court cases by the Waite Court
- List of United States Supreme Court cases, volume 98
- Aleman vs. Judges of the Criminal Division, Circuit Court of Cook County, Illinois, 1998 criminal case in which a previously acquitted defendant who was later found to have bribed the judge hearing the case was ordered retried since the bribery had prevented the state from receiving an honest trial
