= Martin Redish =

American legal scholar

- Born: August 16, 1945 (age 81); New York City, New York
- Education: University of Pennsylvania; Harvard Law School
- Occupation: Law Professor

Martin H. Redish is the Louis and Harriet Ancel Professor of Law and Public Policy at the Northwestern University Pritzker School of Law. Redish has written nineteen books and more than a hundred law review articles in the areas of civil procedure and constitutional law, among others. He is among the most frequently cited American legal scholars.

== Legal theories ==
=== First Amendment ===
Redish supports a “self-realization theory" of free speech, taking the view that the First Amendment protects speech in order to advance individuals' interest in the self-realization that they obtain by being able to speak without government interference. According to Redish, all of the other values attached to free speech, such as the advancement of liberal democracy, necessarily depend on the concept of individual self-realization. This view contrasts with that of scholars such as Alexander Meiklejohn, who advocate a theory of the First Amendment based on the importance of democratic self-governance, and of scholars who subscribe to the theory that the First Amendment exists to promote the marketplace of ideas.

== Career ==
Redish has spent his entire academic career at Northwestern University, where he has been a faculty member since 1973. Before entering academia, he briefly practiced law in New York. Redish received a bachelor's degree in political science from the University of Pennsylvania and a Juris Doctor degree from Harvard Law School.

== Selected publications ==
=== Books ===
- Richard Marcus, Martin Redish, Edward F. Sherman, & James Pfander, Civil Procedure: A Modern Approach (6th ed. 2013)
- Moore's Federal Practice 3d ed., volume 15
- Martin H. Redish, Wholesale Justice: Constitutional Democracy and the Problem of the Class Action Lawsuit (2009)

=== Articles ===
- Martin H. Redish, The Value of Free Speech, 130 U. Pa. L. Rev. 591 (1982)
- Martin H. Redish, Advocacy of Unlawful Conduct and the First Amendment: In Defense of Clear and Present Danger, 70 Cal. L. Rev. 1159 (1982).
- Martin H. Redish, Electronic Discovery and the Litigation Matrix, 51 Duke L.J. 561 (2001)
