= List of United States Supreme Court cases, volume 98 =

Supreme Court of the United States
- Interactive map of Supreme Court of the United States
- 38°53′26″N 77°00′16″W
- Established: March 4, 1789; 236 years ago
- Location: Washington, D.C.
- Coordinates: 38°53′26″N 77°00′16″W
- Composition method: Presidential nomination with Senate confirmation
- Authorised by: Constitution of the United States, Art. III, § 1
- Judge term length: life tenure, subject to impeachment and removal
- Number of positions: 9 (by statute)
- Website: supremecourt.gov

This is a list of cases reported in volume 98 of the United States Reports, decided by the Supreme Court of the United States in 1878 and 1879.

== Justices of the Supreme Court at the time of 98 U.S. ==
The Supreme Court is established by Article III, Section 1 of the Constitution of the United States, which says: "The judicial Power of the United States, shall be vested in one supreme Court . . .". The size of the Court is not specified; the Constitution leaves it to Congress to set the number of justices. Under the Judiciary Act of 1789 Congress originally fixed the number of justices at six (one chief justice and five associate justices). Since 1789 Congress has varied the size of the Court from six to seven, nine, ten, and back to nine justices (always including one chief justice).

When the cases in 98 U.S. were decided the Court comprised the following nine members:

Portrait	Justice	Office	Home State	Succeeded	Date confirmed by the Senate (Vote)	Tenure on Supreme Court
	Morrison Waite	Chief Justice	Ohio	Salmon P. Chase	January 21, 1874 (63–0)	March 4, 1874 – March 23, 1888 (Died)
	Nathan Clifford	Associate Justice	Maine	Benjamin Robbins Curtis	January 12, 1858 (26–23)	January 21, 1858 – July 25, 1881 (Died)
	Noah Haynes Swayne	Associate Justice	Ohio	John McLean	January 24, 1862 (38–1)	January 27, 1862 – January 24, 1881 (Retired)
	Samuel Freeman Miller	Associate Justice	Iowa	Peter Vivian Daniel	July 16, 1862 (Acclamation)	July 21, 1862 – October 13, 1890 (Died)
	Stephen Johnson Field	Associate Justice	California	newly created seat	March 10, 1863 (Acclamation)	May 10, 1863 – December 1, 1897 (Retired)
	William Strong	Associate Justice	Pennsylvania	Robert Cooper Grier	February 18, 1870 (No vote recorded)	March 14, 1870 – December 14, 1880 (Retired)
	Joseph P. Bradley	Associate Justice	New Jersey	newly created seat	March 21, 1870 (46–9)	March 23, 1870 – January 22, 1892 (Died)
	Ward Hunt	Associate Justice	New York	Samuel Nelson	December 11, 1872 (Acclamation)	January 9, 1873 – January 27, 1882 (Retired)
	John Marshall Harlan	Associate Justice	Kentucky	David Davis	November 29, 1877 (Acclamation)	December 10, 1877 – October 14, 1911 (Died)

== Notable Case in 98 U.S. ==
=== Reynolds v. United States ===
In Reynolds v. United States, 98 U.S. 145 (1878), the Supreme Court held that religious duty was not a defense to a criminal indictment. Reynolds was the first Supreme Court decision to address the First Amendment's protection of Freedom of religion, impartial juries, and the Confrontation Clause of the Sixth Amendment.

== Citation style ==
Under the Judiciary Act of 1789 the federal court structure at the time comprised District Courts, which had general trial jurisdiction; Circuit Courts, which had mixed trial and appellate (from the US District Courts) jurisdiction; and the United States Supreme Court, which had appellate jurisdiction over the federal District and Circuit courts—and for certain issues over state courts. The Supreme Court also had limited original jurisdiction (i.e., in which cases could be filed directly with the Supreme Court without first having been heard by a lower federal or state court). There were one or more federal District Courts and/or Circuit Courts in each state, territory, or other geographical region.

Bluebook citation style is used for case names, citations, and jurisdictions.

- "C.C.D." = United States Circuit Court for the District of . . .
  - e.g.,"C.C.D.N.J." = United States Circuit Court for the District of New Jersey
- "D." = United States District Court for the District of . . .
  - e.g.,"D. Mass." = United States District Court for the District of Massachusetts
- "E." = Eastern; "M." = Middle; "N." = Northern; "S." = Southern; "W." = Western
  - e.g.,"C.C.S.D.N.Y." = United States Circuit Court for the Southern District of New York
  - e.g.,"M.D. Ala." = United States District Court for the Middle District of Alabama
- "Ct. Cl." = United States Court of Claims
- The abbreviation of a state's name alone indicates the highest appellate court in that state's judiciary at the time.
  - e.g.,"Pa." = Supreme Court of Pennsylvania
  - e.g.,"Me." = Supreme Judicial Court of Maine

== List of cases in 98 U.S. ==
Case Name	Page & year	Opinion of the Court	Concurring opinion(s)	Dissenting opinion(s)	Lower Court	Disposition
Palmer v. Low	1 (1878)	Waite	none	none	C.C.D. Cal.	affirmed
Glenny v. Langdon	20 (1878)	Clifford	none	none	C.C.S.D. Ohio	affirmed
Bates v. Coe	31 (1878)	Clifford	none	none	C.C.S.D. Ohio	affirmed
Kesner v. Trigg	50 (1878)	Swayne	none	none	C.C.W.D. Va.	affirmed
Peters v. Bowman	56 (1878)	Swayne	none	none	N.D. Miss.	affirmed
United States v. Throckmorton	61 (1878)	Miller	none	none	C.C.D. Cal.	affirmed
Williams v. Hagood	72 (1878)	Strong	none	none	C.C.D.S.C.	affirmed
Garratt v. Seibert	75 (1878)	Strong	none	none	C.C.D. Cal.	affirmed
Ivinson v. Hutton	79 (1878)	Clifford	none	none	Sup. Ct. Terr. Wyo.	reversed
Snell v. Atlantic et al. Ins. Co.	85 (1878)	Harlan	none	none	C.C.N.D. Ill.	reversed
Daviess Cnty. v. Huidekoper	98 (1879)	Hunt	none	none	C.C.W.D. Mo.	affirmed
Bradley v. United States	104 (1878)	Clifford	none	Miller	Ct. Cl.	affirmed
Wirth v. Branson	118 (1878)	Bradley	none	none	C.C.S.D. Ill.	affirmed
Second Nat'l Bank v. Ancient Masons	123 (1878)	Strong	none	none	C.C.E.D. Mo.	affirmed
Giant P. Co. v. California P. Works	126 (1878)	Bradley	none	none	C.C.D.C.	reversed
Citizens' Bank v. Board of Liquid'n	140 (1879)	Waite	none	none	La.	dismissed
Dumont v. United States	142 (1878)	Bradley	none	none	C.C.S.D.N.Y.	reversed
Reynolds v. United States	145 (1879)	Field	none	none	Sup. Ct. Terr. Utah	affirmed
Schuyler Cnty. v. Thomas	169 (1878)	Hunt	none	none	C.C.E.D. Mo.	affirmed
Orvis v. Powell	176 (1878)	Miller	none	none	C.C.N.D. Ill.	affirmed
McKnight v. United States	179 (1879)	Swayne	none	none	Ct. Cl.	affirmed
Stewart v. Sonneborn	187 (1879)	Strong	none	Bradley	C.C.M.D. Ala.	reversed
Snyder v. Sickles	203 (1878)	Clifford	none	none	C.C.E.D. Mo.	affirmed
Elcox v. Hill	218 (1878)	Hunt	none	none	C.C.N.D. Ill.	affirmed
Andreae v. Redfield	225 (1879)	Clifford	none	Miller	C.C.N.D.N.Y.	affirmed
Ex parte Schwab	240 (1878)	Waite	none	none	C.C.E.D. Mich.	show cause denied
Slaughter v. Glenn	242 (1879)	Swayne	none	none	C.C.W.D. Tex.	affirmed
Gifford v. Helms	248 (1878)	Clifford	none	none	C.C.M.D. Ala.	reversed
Bowen v. Chase	254 (1878)	Bradley	none	none	C.C.S.D.N.Y.	affirmed
Beckwith v. Bean	266 (1879)	Harlan	none	Field	C.C.D. Vt.	reversed
City of Little Rock v. National Bank	308 (1878)	Hunt	none	none	C.C.E.D. Ark.	affirmed
Blake v. Hawkins	315 (1879)	Strong	none	none	C.C.E.D.N.C.	reversed
Bank v. McVeigh	332 (1878)	Waite	none	none	Va.	dismissed
United States v. Burlington et al. R.R. Co.	334 (1879)	Field	none	none	C.C.D. Neb.	affirmed
United States v. Hall	343 (1879)	Clifford	none	none	C.C.S.D. Ohio	certification
Atlantic & G.R.R. Co. v. Georgia	359 (1879)	Strong	none	none	Ga.	affirmed
Cleveland Ins. Co. v. Globe Ins. Co.	366 (1879)	Waite	none	Clifford	C.C.N.D. Ohio	dismissed
United States v. City of New Orleans	381 (1879)	Field	none	none	C.C.D. La.	reversed
Baltimore & P.R.R. Co. v. Grant	398 (1879)	Waite	none	none	Sup. Ct. D.C.	dismissed
Mississippi et al. Co. v. Patterson	403 (1879)	Field	none	none	C.C.D. Minn.	affirmed
Scull v. United States	410 (1879)	Miller	none	none	W.D. Mo.	affirmed
United States v. City of Baltimore	424 (1879)	Miller	none	none	D. La.	reversed
Foster v. Mora	425 (1879)	Miller	none	none	C.C.D. Cal.	affirmed
United States v. Perot	428 (1879)	Bradley	none	none	D. La.	affirmed
Carr v. United States	433 (1879)	Bradley	none	none	C.C.D. Cal.	affirmed
The Abbotsford	440 (1879)	Waite	none	none	C.C.E.D. Pa.	affirmed
United States v. Benecke	447 (1879)	Miller	none	none	C.C.W.D. Mo.	certification
United States v. Irvine	450 (1879)	Miller	none	none	C.C.W.D. Mo.	certification
Jennison v. Kirk	453 (1879)	Field	none	none	Cal.	affirmed
Flagstaff S.M. Co. v. Tarbet	463 (1879)	Bradley	none	none	Sup. Ct. Terr. Utah	affirmed
Amy v. City of Dubuque	470 (1879)	Harlan	none	none	C.C.D. Iowa	affirmed
Harkness v. Hyde	476 (1879)	Field	none	none	Sup. Ct. Terr. Idaho	reversed
Railroad Co. v. Varnell	479 (1879)	Clifford	none	none	Sup. Ct. D.C.	affirmed
United States v. Thompson	486 (1879)	Swayne	none	none	C.C.D. Minn.	reversed
Airhart v. Massieu	491 (1879)	Bradley	none	none	C.C.W.D. Tex.	reversed
Reed v. McIntyre	507 (1879)	Harlan	none	none	C.C.D. Minn.	affirmed
Brick v. Brick	514 (1879)	Field	none	none	Sup. Ct. D.C.	reversed
De Treville v. Smalls	517 (1879)	Strong	none	none	C.C.D.S.C.	affirmed
Hooper v. Robinson	528 (1879)	Swayne	none	none	C.C.D. Md.	reversed
Union P.R.R. Co. v. Dodge Cnty.	541 (1879)	Waite	none	none	C.C.D. Neb.	affirmed
Hendrie v. Sayles	546 (1879)	Clifford	none	none	C.C.E.D. Mich.	affirmed
Barnet v. Second Nat'l Bank	555 (1879)	Swayne	none	none	C.C.S.D. Ohio	affirmed
St. Louis et al. Ry. Co. v. Loftin	559 (1879)	Waite	none	none	Ark.	affirmed
United States v. Sherman	565 (1879)	Strong	none	none	Sup. Ct. D.C.	affirmed
United States v. Union P.R.R. Co.	569 (1879)	Miller	none	Swayne	C.C.D. Conn.	affirmed
Union Nat'l Bank v. Matthews	621 (1879)	Swayne	none	Miller	Mo.	reversed
