= Intrinsic fraud =

Intrinsic fraud is an intentionally false representation that goes to the heart of what a given lawsuit is about, in other words, whether fraud was used to procure the transaction. (If the transaction was fraudulent, it probably does not have the legal status of a contract.) Intrinsic fraud is distinguished from extrinsic fraud (a/k/a collateral fraud) which is a deceptive means of keeping a person from discovering and/or enforcing legal rights. It is possible to have both intrinsic and extrinsic frauds.

The U.S. Supreme Court defined and distinguished intrinsic from extrinsic fraud in its unanimous 1878 United States v. Throckmorton decision, written by Justice Samuel Freeman Miller. It described intrinsic fraud as "any matter which was actually presented and considered in the judgment assailed", declining to grant equitable relief to the federal government over an allegation that a settler's land claim in Mexican-ruled California had been secured two decades earlier after California became a U.S. territory through falsified documents and perjured affidavits. Even though the issue had not been raised at the original trial, the Court held that the government had had ample opportunity to exercise due diligence and investigate the evidence.

During a trial, perjury, forgery, and bribery of a witness constitute frauds that might have been relieved by the court. Such actions will usually lead to a mistrial being declared and after any penalties for the involved parties a new trial will take place on the same matter.

Two types of intrinsic fraud in contract law are fraud in the inducement and fraud in the factum.

Fraud in the factum is a legal defense, and occurs where A signs a contract, but either does not realize that it is a contract or does not understand the nature of the contract, because of some false information that B gave to A. For example, if John tells his mother that he is taking a college course on handwriting analysis, and for his homework, he needs her to read and sign a pretend deed. If Mom signs the deed believing what he told her, and John tries to enforce the deed, Mom can plead "fraud in the factum."

Fraud in the inducement is an equitable defense, and occurs when A signs a contract, knowing that it is a contract and (at least having a rough idea) what the contract is about, but the reason A signed the contract was because of some false information that B gave to A. For example, if John tells his mother to sign a deed giving him her property, Mom refuses at first, then John explains that the deed will be kept in a safe deposit box until she dies. If Mom signs the deed because of this statement from John, and John tries to enforce the deed prior to Mom's death, Mom can plead "fraud in the inducement."

== See also ==
- Extrinsic fraud
- Fraud
- Per minas
- Scienter
- Intrinsic Fraud reference
