= Scienter =

Intent or knowledge of wrongdoing

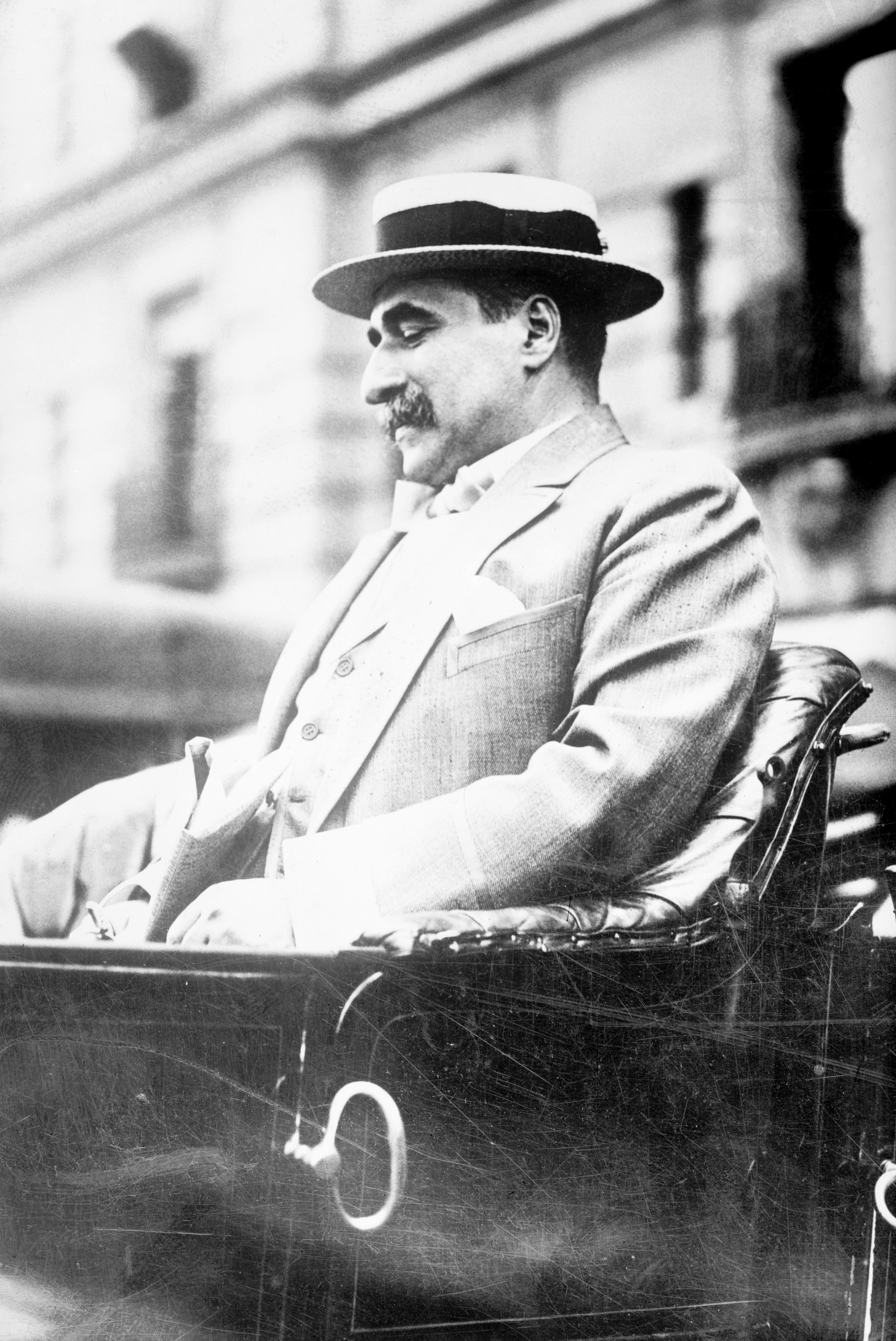
Confidence tricks, such as those done by David Lamar, are a form of fraud. An element of fraud is scienter.

In law, scienter (/saɪˈɛntər/, Law Latin for "knowingly", Latin pronunciation: [skiˈɛntɛr], from Latin scire 'to know, to separate one thing from another') is a legal term for intent or knowledge of wrongdoing, or reckless disregard for the truth. An offending party then has knowledge of the "wrongness" of an act or event prior to committing it.

For example, if a man sells a car with brakes that do not work to his friend, but the seller does not know about the brake problem, the seller then has no scienter. If he sells the car and knew of the problem before he sold the car, he has scienter.

== Scienter action in tort law ==
The scienter action is a category within tort law in some common law jurisdictions that deals with the damage done by an animal directly to a human. Tort law is designed to offer retribution for civil wrongs. Scienter within tort law had a long history in English law until it was abolished by the Animals Act 1971. An action in the common law jurisdictions in which it has not been extinguished by statute is in addition to the torts of negligence and nuisance or more bespoke torts like cattle trespass. If an animal is known to behave in a certain way and is expressed on a person causing injury, an action can be taken in this tort, which also is not available in New South Wales, the Australian Capital Territory, South Australia, or New Zealand. In those jurisdictions, the actions involving animals need to be in nuisance or negligence.

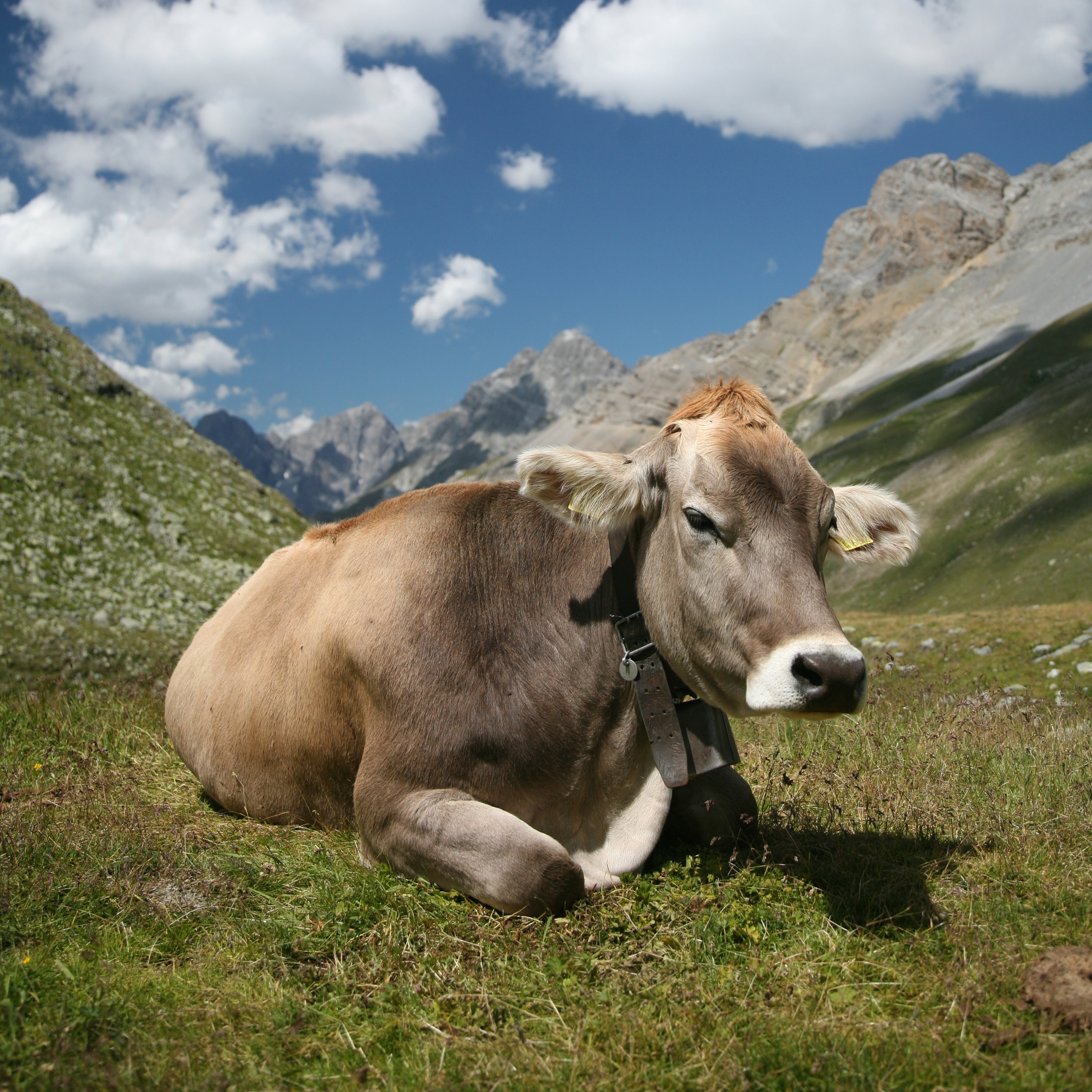
Cattle trespass has been a common tort that involves proving scienter.

To be successful, the plaintiff needs to take action against the person in control of the animal. The plaintiff can file a complaint to initiate a lawsuit to recover damages. It is strict liability, requiring no more than proof of injury, the animal's having a problematic trait, and the knowledge of the person in control about the trait in the animal. Strict liability means that there is no need to argue fault in the form of wilful intent or negligence on the part of the animal or its controller. The only defence is if it can be proved the plaintiff voluntarily assumed the risk of injury by their actions, or if the plaintiff was the cause of the injury.

It is common to distinguish between harmless animals and wild animals, as no scienter is needed for wild animals as long as they are native to their respective regions. Animals are classed as wild or harmless on the basis of species or kind, not on the basis of being a tame individual. An elephant is considered wild regardless of its use. The scienter action is referred to in Rylands v. Fletcher in that one who keeps a wild thing "must keep it at his peril" to make reference to part of Justice Colin Blackburn's comment.

== General use ==
Scienter is generally used as a necessary condition of certain causes of civil action and as a standard for civil liability or criminal guilt. For instance, Section 1960 of Title 18 of the United States Code provides a scienter condition, requiring that the accused "knowingly conducts, controls, manages, supervises, directs, or owns" a prohibited type of business.

The concept of scienter is uniformly expressed in the text of the U.S. Code as the word know, appearing as "knowingly", "actual knowledge", "known", "knowledge fairly implied", etc. The word scienter is not used in the text of the U.S. Code, although it appears once in a section title. This use reflects the development of American law speaking plainly in its statutes.

== In contract law ==
Scienter is also an element of the contract law cause of action for breach of contract in which the aggrieved party alleges some destruction of the meeting of the minds, also known as mutual assent, because of fraud, misrepresentation, or duress per minas. Distinguishing innocent misrepresentation and fraudulent misrepresentation involves determining if scienter exists. In contract fraud, scienter is defined as intent to deceive.

Scienter can also be used as a defence to a breach of contract lawsuit.

== Element of claim of securities fraud ==
In the United States, to prevail in a securities fraud claim under Section 10(b) of the Securities Exchange Act of 1934, a plaintiff must allege and prove that the defendant acted with scienter.

The Private Securities Litigation Reform Act of 1995 added the requirement that a plaintiff must plead facts giving rise to a "strong inference" of scienter. The meaning of scienter under the 1995 law has been controversial since its enactment. The United States Supreme Court issued a decision that clarified what was to be understood as a "strong inference." In Tellabs, Inc. v. Makor Issues & Rights, Ltd., an 8–1 ruling of the Court defined the standard that the plaintiff had to meet to proceed with a securities fraud litigation. A complaint must show "cogent and compelling evidence" of scienter.

== See also ==
- Intrinsic fraud
- Fraud
- Mens rea
- Per minas
- Relativism
