= Per minas =

By means of menaces or threats

Per minas, in English Common Law, is to engage in behaviour "by means of menaces or threats".

The term comes from Latin.

Per minas has been used as a defence of duress to certain crimes, as affecting the element of mens rea. William Blackstone, the often-cited judge and legal scholar, addressed the use of "duress per minas" under the category of self-defense as a means of securing the "right of personal security", that is, the right of self-defence.

The classic case involves a person who is blackmailed into robbing a bank.

In contract law, Blackstone used per minas to describe the defence of duress, as affecting the element of contract intent, mutual assent, or meeting of the minds.

== See also ==
- Assault
- Coercion
- Contract law
- Criminal law
- Duress
- Intimidation
- Intrinsic fraud
- Fraud
- Scienter
- Self-defense
