= Moore's Federal Practice =

Moore's Federal Practice is an American legal treatise covering the Federal Rules of Evidence, Federal Rules of Civil Procedure, Federal Rules of Criminal Procedure, and Federal Rules of Appellate Procedure. Along with Charles Alan Wright and Arthur R. Miller's Federal Practice and Procedure, it is one of the most frequently cited treatises in federal court practice in the United States.
