= Mosaic theory =

Mosaic theory may refer to:

- Mosaic effect, the concept and overall theory of combining data to reveal new insights.
- Mosaic theory (US law), US jurisprudence about piecemeal information gathering
- Mosaic theory (investments), investigative technique used in financial analysis
- Mosaic coevolution, geography and ecology
- Cultural mosaic, theory of multicultural values
