= Selective disclosure =

Selective disclosure is a situation when a publicly traded company discloses material information to a single person, or a limited group of people or investors, as opposed to disclosing the information to all investors at the same time.

Material information is roughly defined as information that would cause a reasonable investor to make a buy or sell decision.

A problem with selective disclosure that the U.S. Securities and Exchange Commission (SEC) sought to eliminate with Regulation Fair Disclosure(a.k.a. Regulation FD or Reg FD), is that it creates an uneven playing field for investors, allowing some investors to profit from material market moving information before others.

An example of a selective disclosure could go as follows: A company insider tells a small group of Wall Street analysts that the company is going to beat current analyst consensus estimates for earnings per share. If this is the first time the company disclosed such guidance, and the guidance wasn't simultaneously disseminated to all investors via a press release or publicized webcast, then the disclosure would constitute selective disclosure.

== See also ==
- Insider trading
