= United States v. Reynolds =

- Supreme Court of the United States

Argued October 21, 1952 Decided March 9, 1953
- Full case name: United States v. Reynolds, Certiorari to the United States Court of Appeals for the Third Circuit
- Citations: 345 U.S. 1 (more) 73 S. Ct. 528; 97 L. Ed. 727

Case history
- Prior: Judgments entered in favor of the plaintiffs upheld, Reynolds v. United States, 192 F.2d 987 (3d Cir. 1951); cert. granted, 343 U.S. 918 (1952).

Holding
- In this case, there was a valid claim of privilege under Rule 34; and a judgment based under Rule 37 on refusal to produce the documents subjected the United States to liability to which Congress did not consent by the Federal Tort Claims Act.

Court membership
- Chief Justice Fred M. Vinson Associate Justices Hugo Black · Stanley F. Reed; Felix Frankfurter · William O. Douglas; Robert H. Jackson · Harold H. Burton; Tom C. Clark · Sherman Minton

Case opinions
- Majority: Vinson, joined by Reed, Douglas, Burton, Clark, Minton
- Dissent: Black
- Dissent: Frankfurter
- Dissent: Jackson

Laws applied
- Federal Tort Claims Act

United States v. Reynolds, 345 U.S. 1 (1953), is a landmark legal case decided in 1953, which saw the formal recognition of the state secrets privilege, a judicially recognized extension of presidential power. The US Supreme Court confirmed that "the privilege against revealing military secrets ... is well established in the law of evidence".

== Overview ==
Three employees of the Radio Corporation of America, an Air Force contractor, were killed when a B-29 Superfortress crashed in 1948 in Waycross, Georgia. Their widows brought an action in tort seeking damages in federal court, under the Federal Tort Claims Act. As part of this action, they requested production of accident reports concerning the crash, but were told by the Air Force that the release of such details would threaten national security. Because of the failure of the government to produce the documents, a directed verdict in favor of the plaintiffs was granted by the trial court. The judgment was affirmed by the United States Court of Appeals for the Third Circuit. The United States Supreme Court reversed the decision, and remanded it to the trial court. After this, a settlement was reached with the widows, who received an aggregate sum of $170,000 in exchange for a release of liability to the Government.

== Issues ==
1. Are the Judge Advocate General of the United States Air Force and the Secretary of the Air Force allowed to assert privilege in the face of a suit brought under the Federal Tort Claims Act and the application for production of documents under Rule 34 of the Federal Rules of Civil Procedure?
2. Does the doctrine in federal criminal cases of letting the defendant go free by dismissing the criminal charges in cases where evidence is not produced by the government apply to federal civil (tort) cases brought under the Federal Tort Claims Act?
3. Was the judgment entered by the District Court under the Federal Tort Claims Act against the United States Government and in favor of the plaintiffs for failure to produce the documents in question proper?
4. Was the affirmation of the judgment of the Third Court of Appeals proper?

== Holdings ==
In this case, there was a valid claim of privilege under Rule 34; and a judgment based under Rule 37 on refusal to produce the documents subjected the United States to liability which Congress did not consent by the Federal Tort Claims Act.

1. As used in Rule 34, which compels production only of matters "not privileged," the term "not privileged" refers to "privileges" as that term is understood in the law of evidence.
2. When the Secretary lodged his formal claim of privilege, he invoked a privilege against revealing military secrets – one which is well established in the law of evidence.
3. When a claim of privilege against revealing military secrets is invoked, the courts must decide whether the occasion for invoking the privilege is appropriate, and yet do so without jeopardizing the security which the privilege was meant to protect.
4. When the formal claim of privilege was filed by the Secretary, under the circumstances indicating a reasonable possibility that military secrets were involved, there was a sufficient showing of privilege to cut off further demand for the documents on the showing of necessity for its compulsion that had been made.
5. In this case, the showing of necessity was greatly minimized by plaintiffs' rejection of the Judge Advocate General's offer to make the surviving crew member available for examination.
6. The doctrine in the criminal field that the Government can invoke its evidence privileges only at the price of letting the defendant go free has no application in a civil forum, where the Government is not the moving party, but is a defendant only on terms to which it has consented.

In a suit under the Tort Claims Act, the District Court entered a judgment against the Government. The Court of Appeals affirmed. The Supreme Court reversed and remanded.

== Facts and background ==
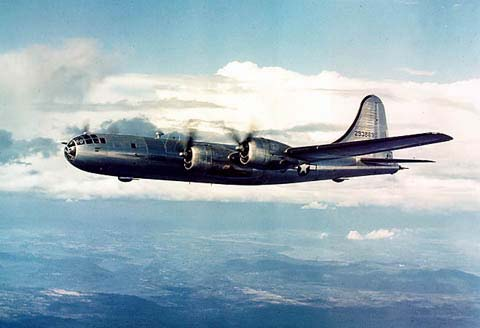
The case United States v. Reynolds involved the refusal of the Government to release reports concerning a B-29 Superfortress crash in 1948.

A military aircraft on a flight to test secret electronic equipment crashed, and certain civilian observers aboard were killed. Their widows sued the United States under the Federal Tort Claims Act and moved under Rule 34 of the Federal Rules of Civil Procedure for production of the Air Force's accident investigation report and statements made by surviving crew members during the investigation. The Secretary of the Air Force filed a formal claim of privilege, stating that the matters were privileged against disclosure under the Air Force regulations issued under R. S. section 161, and that the aircraft and its personnel were "engaged in a highly secret mission." The Judge Advocate General filed an affidavit stating that the material could not be furnished "without seriously hampering national security," but he offered to produce the surviving crew members for examination by the plaintiffs and to permit them to testify as to all matters except those of a "classified nature." In the absence of the documents which the Air Force failed to produce, the trial court directed a summary judgment for the plaintiffs against the Government. The Appeals Court of the Third Circuit affirmed the decision. The United States appealed to the Supreme Court in certiorari.

== Opinion ==
=== Majority opinion by Justice Vinson ===
The majority opinion was written by Justice Fred M. Vinson. He wrote, "We have had broad propositions pressed upon us for decision. The Government has claimed privilege to withhold information in their custody, if it is in the public interest to do so. Respondents [plaintiffs] have asserted that the executive's power to withhold documents was waived by the Tort Claims Act. Both positions have constitutional overtones which we find it unnecessary to pass upon, there being a narrower ground for decision."

"The Federal Tort Claims Act expressly makes the Federal Rules of Civil Procedure applicable to suits against the United States. The judgment in this case imposed liability upon the Government by operation of Rule 37, for refusal to produce documents under Rule 34. Since Rule 34 compels production only of matters "not privileged," the essential question is whether there was a valid claim of privilege under the Rule. We hold that there was, and that, therefore, the judgment below subjected the United States to liability on terms to which Congress did not consent by the Tort Claims Act."

=== Dissenting opinion ===
Justice Hugo Black, Justice Felix Frankfurter and Justice Robert H. Jackson filed a one sentence dissent indicating they agreed with the decision by Judge Maris in the earlier Court of Appeals decision.

== Subsequent declassification of documents ==
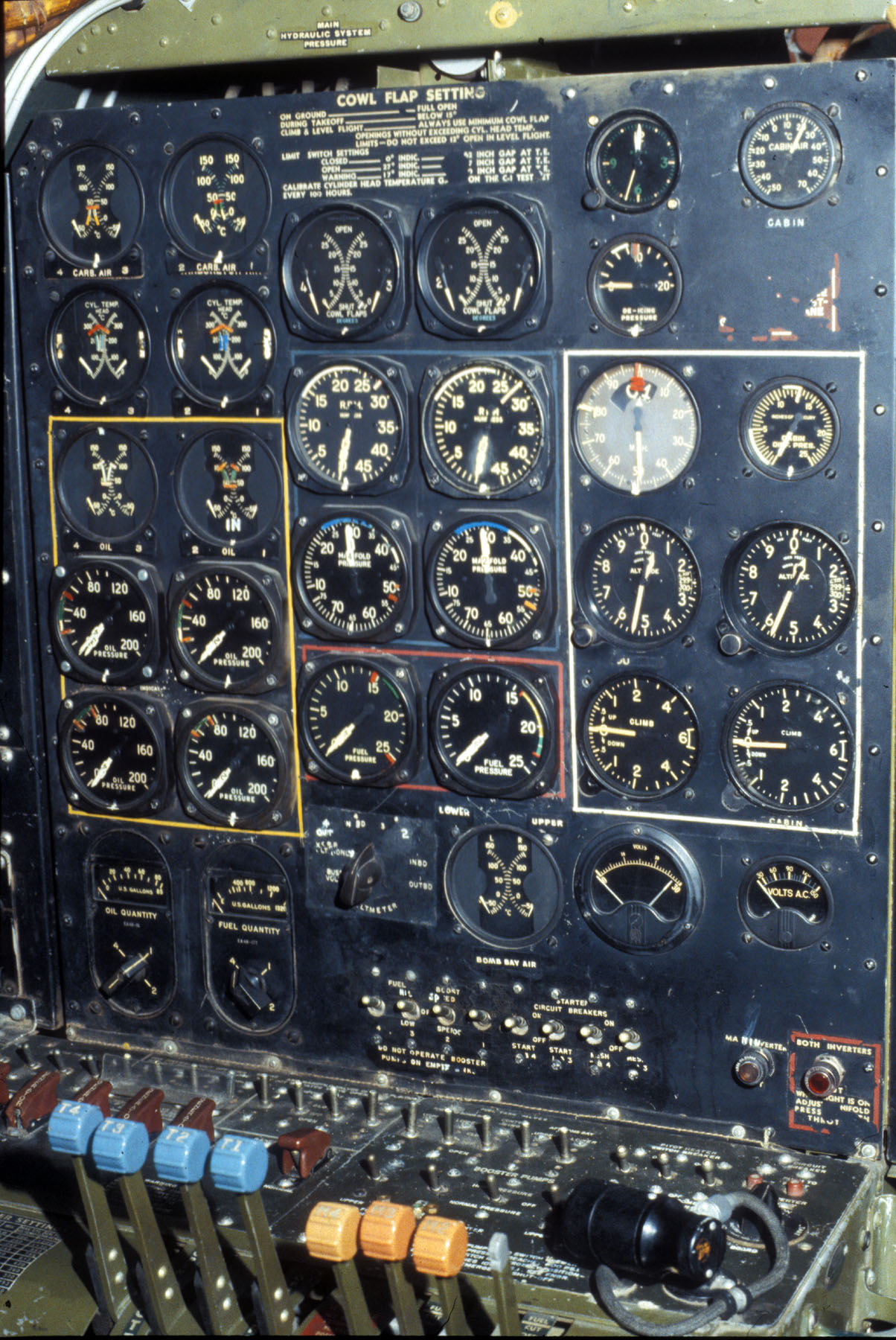
The B-29 crashed while testing classified electronic equipment.

The declassified accident report, released in 2000, is available online, and indicates that the B-29 crashed because a fire started in an engine. This document also reports that the plaintiffs received a settlement of $170,000. The settlement date was effective June 22, 1953, some three months after the Supreme Court ruling. In consideration for the money paid by the government, the case was dismissed with prejudice, meaning all future litigation on this case was forfeited. The radio program This American Life reported in 2009, that, contrary to claims made in the case, the accident report contained no information on the secret equipment on the plane except to note that secret equipment was present, a fact which had been reported in the press at the time. The program interviewed the daughter of one of the crash victims who described the government's claims in the case as fraudulent.

After release of the classified documents, new litigation was attempted, based in part on a complaint that the classified material contained no secret information. Monetary damages were sought as a remedy. The initial new claim was to the Supreme Court for a writ of error in coram nobis, based on the claim that the use of the "secret" label in the original crash report was a fraud on the court. This was an attempt to overturn the settlement agreement of June 1953. This motion was denied on June 23, 2003 in In re Herring. The case was refiled as Herring v. United States in the United States District Court for the Eastern District of Pennsylvania on October 1, 2003. The trial court found no fraud in the government's claim of privilege in 1953.

In 2005, the Court of Appeals for the Third Circuit upheld the decision in the new litigation, in which District Court determined "there was no fraud because the documents, read in their historical context, could have revealed secret information about the equipment being tested on the plane and, on a broader reading, the claim of privilege referred to both the mission and the workings of the B-29". Even without the broad reading that the claim included secrecy concerning the aircraft itself, the court found it possible that the documents' revelations "that the mission required an 'aircraft capable of dropping bombs' and that the mission required an airplane capable of 'operating at altitudes of 20,000 feet and above'" could have been "seemingly insignificant pieces of information [that] would have been of keen interest to a Soviet spy fifty years ago."

== Discussion and criticism of privilege in Reynolds ==
There has been much discussion about the use of government privilege to classify information. On the one hand, there is the need to protect government secrecy. On the other, there is always suspicion that "classified documents" are merely a way to cover-up government malfeasance or bad faith actions of the executive branch.

=== Prosser and Keaton ===
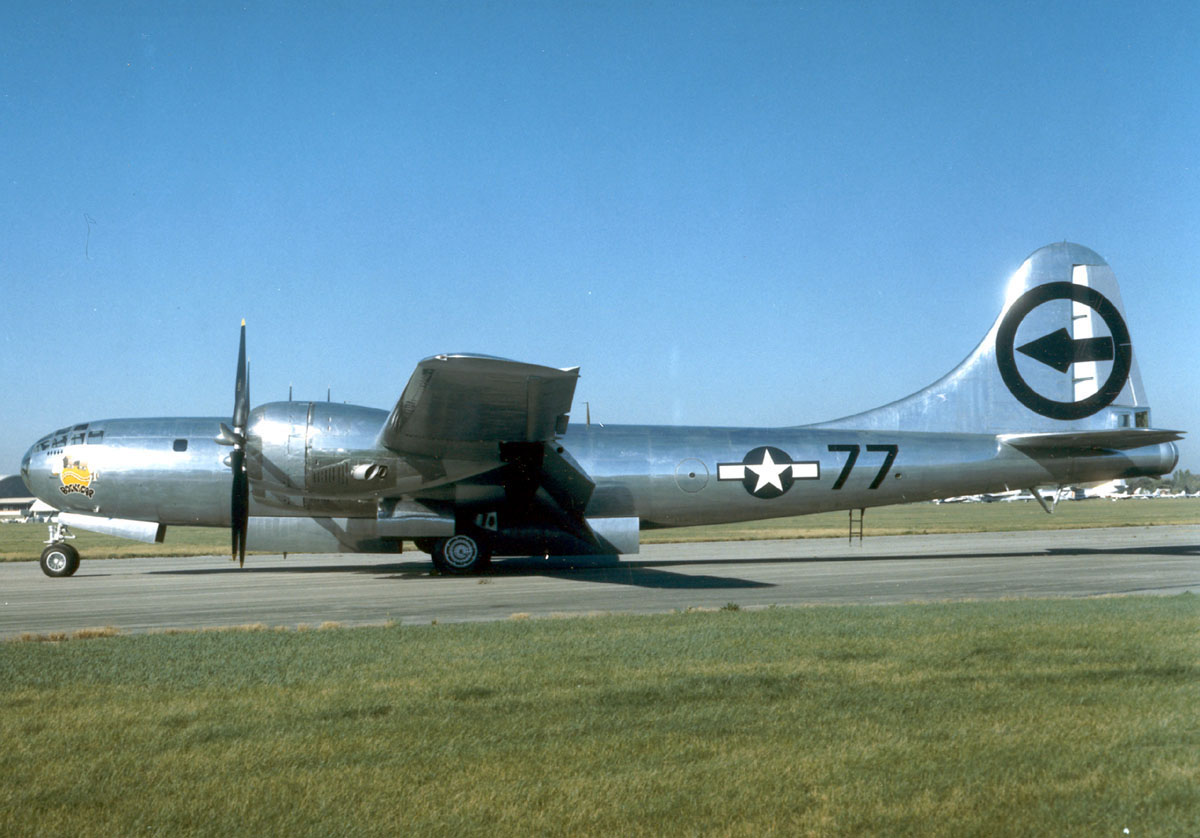
The 1953 Supreme Court decision in Reynolds is still contentious.

Privilege is the modern term applied to those considerations which avoid liability where it might otherwise follow. As it is generally used, the term applies to any circumstance used to justify or excuse a prima facie tort, such as an assault, battery or trespass. It signifies that the defendant has acted to further an interest of such social importance that it is entitled to protection, even at the expense of damage to the plaintiff. The defendant is allowed freedom of action because his own interests, or those of the public, require it, and because social policy will best be served by permitting it. The privilege is bounded by current ideas of what will most effectively promote the general welfare. The question of "privilege" as a defense arises almost exclusively in connection with intentional torts. Negligence is a matter of risk and probability of harm; and where the likelihood of injury to the plaintiff is relatively slight, the defendant will necessarily be allowed greater latitude than where the harm is intended, or substantially certain to follow. It is the bare value of the respective interests involved and the extent of the harm from which the act is intended to protect the one as compared with that which it is intended to cause to the other which determines the existence or nonexistence of the privilege.

The relative social value given to an interest which the defendant seeks to further can affect the nature and extent of a privilege. Occasionally, the defendant may act at his peril if he makes a mistake of fact or law; at other times, an actor is justified in acting on the basis of what the facts reasonably appear to be. At other times, the defendant is justified so long as he was acting in good faith. Or, the privilege may be regarded as absolute in the sense that the court will not permit an inquiry into motive or purpose, since this could result in subjecting the honest person to harassing litigation and claims. When no inquiry is permitted into motive or purpose, it is sometimes said that defendant has an absolute privilege; when the defendant can act in either good or bad faith, with impunity, it is more properly called "immunity" rather than "privilege".

=== Judiciary Hearing, 2008 ===
Many commentators have alleged government misuse of secrecy in the wake of the Supreme Court decision in the case of Reynolds. Senator Leahy in his opening remarks for the Senate Judiciary Committee's February 13, 2008, hearing on the State Secrets Privilege called the Third Circuit's decision in Herring v. United States (2005) "a little mystifying". The hearing featured testimony from several experts in the field of government privilege.

==== Carl J. Nichols ====
Testimony of Carl J. Nichols, Deputy Assistant Attorney General of the Department of Justice Civil Division.

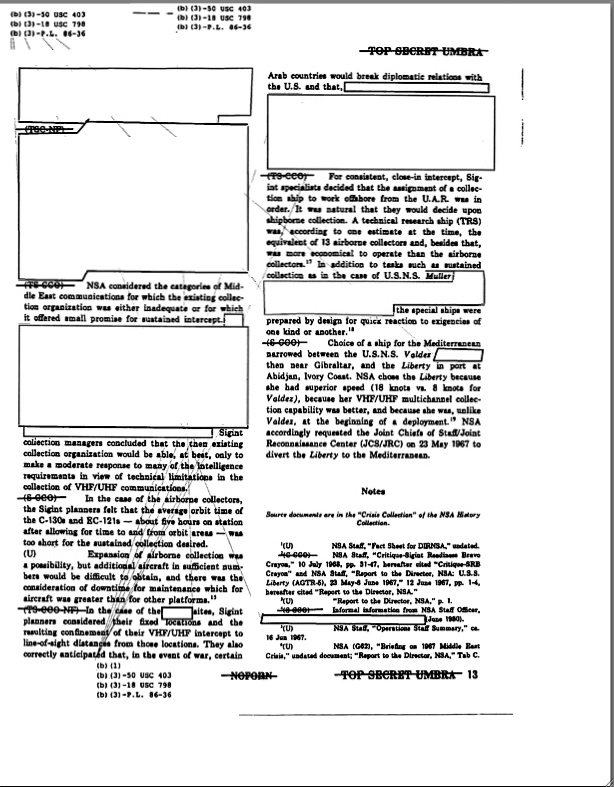
Example of a redacted, declassified version of a top secret document released by the U.S. government

The state secrets privilege serves a vital function by ensuring that private litigants cannot use litigation to force the disclosure of information that, if made public, would directly harm the national security of the United States. The privilege has a long-standing history and has been invoked to protect such information. The privilege is firmly rooted in the constitutional authorities and obligations assigned to the President under Article II to protect the national security of the United States.

Accountability is preserved by a number of procedural and substantive requirements that must be satisfied before a court may accept an assertion of the state secrets privilege. The Supreme Court in Reynolds held that such information should be protected from disclosure when there is a "danger that compulsion of the evidence will expose military matters which, in the interest of national security, should not be divulged." The Court noted that the privilege was absolute, even if the need in the plaintiff was compelling. The Fifth Circuit has noted, "the greater public good – ultimately the less harsh remedy" is to protect the information from disclosure, even where the result might be dismissal of the lawsuit.

It is well established that the President is constitutionally charged with protecting information relating to national security. As the Supreme Court has stated, "[t]the authority to protect such information falls upon the President as the head of the Executive Branch and as Commander in Chief." The state secrets privilege is not a mere "common law" privilege. Instead the courts have long recognized the privilege has a firm foundation in the Constitution as was noted in United States v. Nixon where the Supreme Court noted the claim of privilege "relates to the effective discharge of the President's powers, it is constitutionally based."

In the case of Herring v. United States, where it was disclosed that the declassified accident report from Reynolds was reviewed, Judge Davis found, "[d]etails of flight mechanics, B-29 glitches, and technical remedies in the hands of the wrong party could surely compromise national security," and thus "may have been of great moment to sophisticated intelligent analysts and Soviet engineers alike." The Court of Appeals for the Third Circuit agreed. (Note that the first Tupolev Tu-4, a Russian copy of the B-29 developed from captured aircraft, had flown in 1947. In the instant case, it was the electronic equipment which was classified as top secret, not the basic airframe of the B-29.)

The assertion of the privilege is not lightly entertained, and there are multiple administrative hurdles which have to be overcome once it is chosen to be asserted. There are multiple internal reviews, and the court has the final oversight. Still, the Executive Branch is given the utmost deference, and the courts cannot get into the business of second-guessing national security and foreign policy questions.

==== Patricia M. Wald ====
Testimony of Patricia M. Wald, Former Judge, United States Court of Appeals for the District of Columbia Circuit (1979–1999).

The states secrets privilege is a common law privilege originating with the judiciary which enunciated its necessity and laid down some directions for its scope in cases going back to the 19th century but more recently highlighted in United States v. Reynolds. In the criminal area, the Classified Information Procedures Act (CIPA) provides a relevant model for alternatives to full disclosure of classified information which allow a prosecution to continue while affording a defendant his or her due process rights. The time is now ripe for such legislation in the civil arena; litigants and their counsel are confused and unsure as to how to proceed in cases where the government raises the privilege; the courts themselves are confronted with precedent going in many different directions as to the scope of their authority and the requirements exercising it.

It is my opinion that the Freedom of Information Act should allow a judge to review the material and make a determination whether the assertion of privilege is warranted. The goal should be flexibility in the interpretation, leaving the determination to the judge in the federal court.

==== Louis Fisher ====
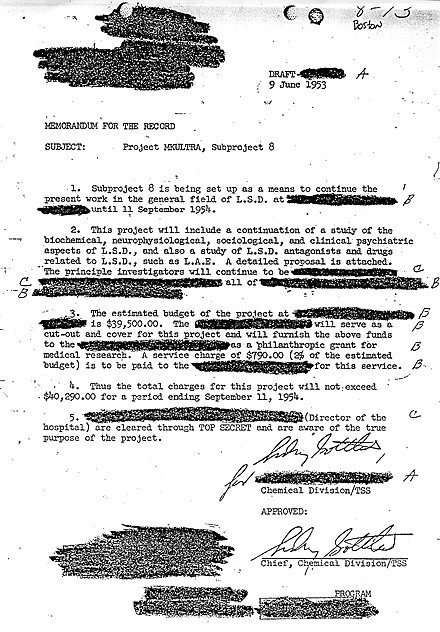
Another redacted government document, this from CIA 1953 LSD experiments

Testimony of Louis Fisher, Constitutional Law Expert, Library of Congress.

A "state secret" refers to any information that, if disclosed publicly, would be reasonably likely to cause significant harm to the national defense or foreign relations of the United States. Few judges, reading this language, will be likely to challenge the government. I would prefer to add a second sentence to the definition: "The assertion of a state secret by the executive branch is to be tested by independent judicial review."

Concerning "immunity", I would like to see a third sentence added to the definition: "The 'states secrets privilege' may not shield illegal or unconstitutional activities." I see no reason privilege should sanction violations of statutes, treaties, or the Constitution.

Our experience with state secrets cases underscores the need for judicial independence in assessing executive claims.

==== Michael A. Vatis ====
Testimony of Michael A. Vatis, Partner, Steptoe & Johnson LLP.

There are two bedrock principles which are in natural tension. Secrecy in government can be an absolute necessity to the protection of our national security. This is especially so today, where the surveillance of terrorist groups is essential.

At the same time, the second principle is equally true. Secrecy in government is antithetical to democratic governance. Too much secrecy shields officials from oversight and inevitably breeds abuse and misconduct; it thus can fatally weaken the system of checks and balances that defines our system of government.

Add to this the corollary: there are secrets, then there are secrets. Too often, information deemed classified by the Executive Branch merely echoes what was in last week's newspapers. Classified material is frequently released to the public for strictly political reasons. In truth, many "classified" documents have no reason to be called such.

== See also ==
- List of United States Supreme Court cases, volume 345
- Jencks v. United States
- Halkin v. Helms
- Declassification
- Classified information in the United States
- Born secret
