= Regulation Fair Disclosure =

US Securities and Exchange Commission regulation

Regulation FD (Fair Disclosure), ordinarily referred to as Regulation FD or Reg FD, is a regulation that was promulgated by the U.S. Securities and Exchange Commission (SEC) in August 2000. The regulation is codified as 17 CFR 243. Although "FD" stands for "fair disclosure", as can be learned from the adopting release, the regulation was and is codified in the Code of Federal Regulations simply as Regulation FD. Subject to certain limited exceptions, the rules generally prohibit public companies from disclosing previously nonpublic, material information to certain parties unless the information is distributed to the public first or simultaneously.

== Details ==
The regulation sought to stamp out selective disclosure, in which some investors (often large institutional investors) received market moving information before others (often smaller, individual investors), and were allowed to trade on it.

=== Insider exception ===
Under Regulation FD, selective disclosure may be made so long as the company first collects a confidentiality agreement from the other party (or the other party is already subject to a duty of trust and confidence). Although the agreement need not include an undertaking not to trade on the information, the regulation was heavily driven by a desire to make it easier to prosecute recipients of selective information for insider trading, because in many instances only persons who owe such a duty are subject to such prosecution. Thus, the SEC explained in the Proposing Release:

"To make clear the scope of the Regulation, paragraph (b) of Rule 100 expressly states that the Rule does not apply to disclosures of material information to persons who are bound by duties of trust or confidence not to disclose or use the information for trading. Paragraph (b) expressly refers to several types of persons whose misuse of the information would subject them to insider trading liability under Rule 10b-5: (1) "temporary" insiders of an issuer – e.g., outside consultants, such as its attorneys, investment bankers, or accountants;42 and (2) any other person who has expressly agreed to maintain the information in confidence, and whose misuse of the information for trading would thus be covered either under the "temporary insider" or "misappropriation" theory."

Thus, in essence, there is an exception to Regulation FD that allows disclosure to anyone who is an insider, or becomes a "temporary insider," subject to insider trading prohibitions.

=== Venues and social media ===
On April 2, 2013, the Securities and Exchange Commission said companies can use social media to disseminate information if certain requirements are met. As with company websites, investors’ access to the chosen social media platform must not be restricted and investors must be notified about which social media will be used to disseminate information.

=== Materiality and public record ===
The rule only prohibits private disclosure of material information. This means that the company disclose "seemingly inconsequential data" which might prove consequential in a mosaic. The company can inform also analysts of public record information without necessarily violating the rule.

=== Applicability ===
The rule only applies to certain groups such as securities market professionals and shareholders, which allows the company to continue providing necessary information to business partners.

== Background ==
Before the 1990s, most individual investors followed the progress of their stock holdings by receiving phone calls from their broker, by reading annual or quarterly reports mailed to them by the company, by reading news in newspapers or financial publications, or by calling the company with questions. Most investors relied primarily upon full service brokers, such as Merrill Lynch, for trading advice.

By 1999, individual investors became more aware of quarterly analyst conference calls, where a company's management would disclose the results of the quarter and answer analyst questions about the company's past performance and future prospects. At the time, most companies did not allow small investors to attend their calls.

One small investor, Mark Coker, founded a company called Bestcalls.com, a directory of conference calls open to all investors, to help persuade public companies to open up all their calls. Coker campaigned in the press to educate individual investors about the benefits of conference call attendance as a fundamental research tool, and worked constructively with the SEC to educate them about the pervasiveness of selective disclosure on earnings conference calls. At the same time, companies such as Onstream Media, Broadcast.com, Vcall.com, Shareholder.com and Thomson Financial (now Thomson Reuters) offered webcasting technology and services that made it more practical, and more affordable, for companies to allow all investors to listen in.

In December 1999, the SEC proposed Regulation FD. Thousands of individual investors wrote the SEC and voiced their support for the regulation. But support was not unanimous. Large institutional investors, accustomed to benefiting from selectively disclosed material information, fought vigorously against the proposed regulation. They argued that fair disclosure would lead to less disclosure. In October 2000, the SEC promulgated Regulation FD.

== Enforcement ==
In 2017, the SEC charged TherapeuticsMD with violating Regulation FD, which was the first case focused on the regulation in six years.
