= Halkin v. Helms =

Halkin v. Helms is a landmark 1978 United States Court of Appeals for the District of Columbia Circuit case concerning the State secrets privilege.

== Summary ==
Courts are generally deferential in state secrets cases. Halkin v. Helms was a landmark 1978 case where antiwar protesters filed a lawsuit to force the NSA to disclose if the protesters were surveillance targets. The defendants claim of state secrets was affirmed by the D.C Circuit. This was fatal to the litigation - the court dismissed the suit because the plaintiffs would not be able to establish the prima facie case that the electronic surveillance was unlawful without the privileged information.

== Parties ==
The defendants in the case were officials of the following government agencies: the National Security Agency, the Central Intelligence Agency, the Defense Intelligence Agency, the Federal Bureau of Investigation and the Secret Service.

Joined as defendants were three communications corporations: RCA Global Communications, Western Union International and ITT World Communications.

== Complaint ==
The plaintiffs alleged that the NSA conducted warrantless interceptions of international wire, cable and telephone communications. The NSA conducted these interceptions at the request of other federal defendants, and with cooperation from the corporate defendants.

== Government motion to dismiss ==
The government moved to dismiss the complaint on the ground that pleading in response to it "would reveal important military and state secrets respecting the capabilities of the NSA for the collection and analysis of foreign intelligence".

== Case ==
The question before the court was whether the NSA can be ordered to disclose if they have acquired the international communications of the plaintiffs and shared them with other federal agencies as part of Operation Minaret (1967-1973) and Operation Shamrock.

As a "service organization", the NSA produces intelligence as required by the Director of Central Intelligence.

The acquired communications have at least one foreign terminal. Different techniques are used to collect signals. "Watchlists" are used to identify communications of interest, which are printed out for further review by intelligence analysts. This "foreign intelligence" is reported to the agencies that have requested it. The rest of the communications, not identified as containing the watchlist words, are discarded without being read.

As part of Minaret and Shamrock the watchlists included names of 1200 US citizens provided by the Bureau of Narcotics, the CIA, FBI, Secret Service and military intelligence, concerning investigations in the areas of terrorism, executive protection, international narcotics trafficking and possible foreign influence over domestic organizations.

Because some of the "secret" information had become public through leaks and so on, the district court dismissed only the complaint as to Minaret but not Shamrock. They reasoned the public disclosures concerning Shamrock were sufficient to decline to extend the state secret privilege.

The D.C. Circuit Court of Appeals reversed, finding that both programs were protected by the privilege. The public disclosures about Shamrock had not revealed the identities of the targets, and so based on the "mosaic" theory of intelligence, they found that revealing this information would provide insight of intelligence value. They write:

It requires little reflection to understand that the business of foreign intelligence gathering in this age of computer technology is more akin to the construction of a mosaic than it is to the management of a cloak and dagger affair. Thousands of bits and pieces of seemingly innocuous information can be analyzed and fitted into place to reveal with startling clarity how the unseen whole must operate.

The "utmost deference" standard established in Halkin has been influential and is applied under the mosaic theory of intelligence gathering (stated above) even to "seemingly innocuous information".

== See also ==
- United States v. Reynolds
