= Mosaic effect =

Deduction of secret data from public sources

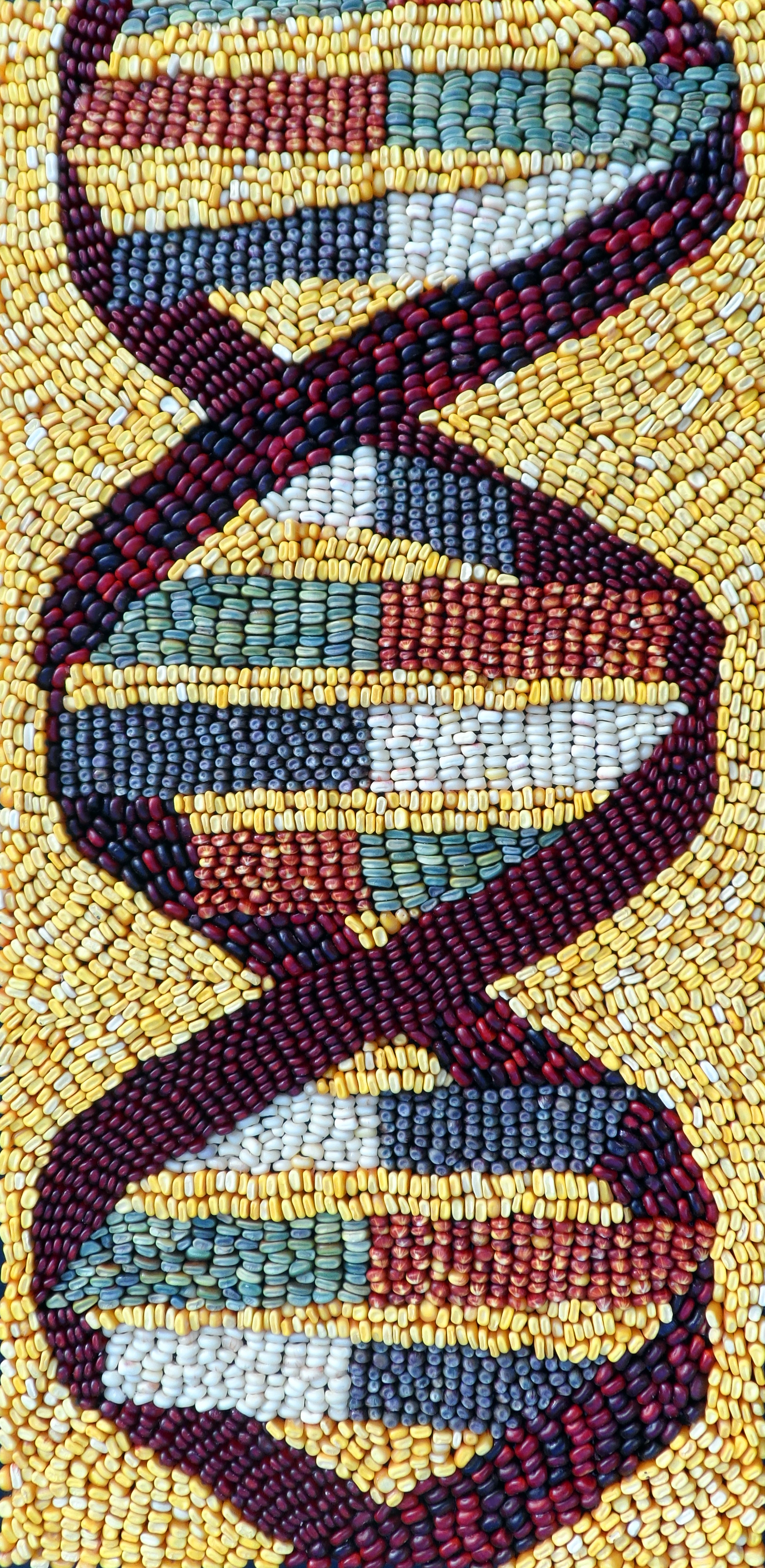
An example of DNA, depicted in a mosaic style of art from unique pieces of maize. The mosaic data concept is named for the art style.

The mosaic effect, also called the mosaic theory, is the concept that aggregating multiple data sources can reveal sensitive or classified information that individual elements would not disclose. It originated in U.S. intelligence and national security law, where analysts warned that publicly available or unclassified fragments could, when combined, compromise operational secrecy or enable the identification of protected subjects. The concept has since shaped classification policy, especially through judicial deference in Freedom of Information Act (FOIA) cases and executive orders authorizing the withholding of information based on its cumulative impact.

Beyond national security, the mosaic effect has become a foundational idea in privacy, scholarship and digital surveillance law. Courts, researchers, and civil liberties groups have documented how metadata, location trails, behavioral records, and seemingly anonymized datasets can be cross-referenced to re-identify individuals or infer sensitive characteristics. Legal analysts have cited the mosaic effect in challenges to government data retention, smart meter surveillance, and automatic license plate recognition systems. Related concerns appear in reproductive privacy, humanitarian aid, and religious profiling, where data recombination threatens vulnerable groups.

In finance, the mosaic theory refers to a legal method of evaluating securities by synthesizing public and immaterial non-public information. It has also been adapted in other fields such as environmental monitoring, where satellite data mosaics can reveal patterns of deforestation or agricultural activity, and in healthcare, where complex traits like hypertension are modeled through interconnected causal factors. The term applies both to intentional analytic practices and to inadvertent data aggregation that leads to privacy breaches or security exposures.

== Overview and background ==
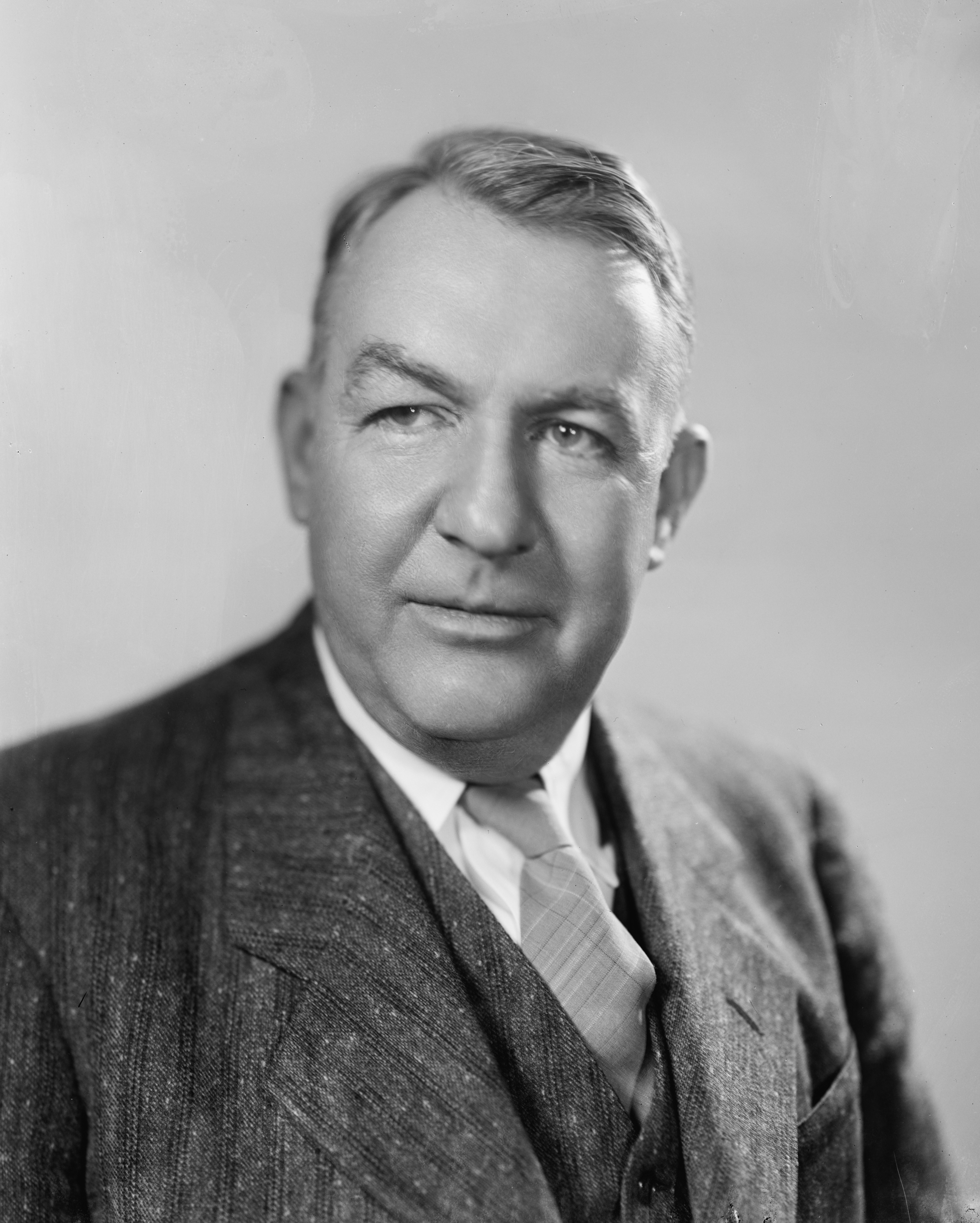
US Senator Sam Ervin raised alarms about what would be called the mosaic effect as early as 1974.

The mosaic effect, sometimes called mosaic theory or mosaicking, refers to combining data to reveal sensitive information not apparent in individual datasets, akin to assembling a mosaic from individual tiles. A core concern of mosaic theory is that large-scale data aggregation may reveal private facts about individuals that are not apparent from any single data point. Mosaic effect and theory concerns "the collection, analysis and correlation" of data rather than individual surveillance methods in isolation. The term "mosaic effect" originates in intelligence analysis, describing how seemingly harmless fragments of information can, when aggregated, enable sensitive inferences.

The process of combining unrelated datasets to create a richer individual profile exemplifies the mosaic effect's capacity to bridge previously unlinked information across digital ecosystems. Authorized queries within such datasets can produce outcomes where benign data combinations result in the disclosure of otherwise privileged or sensitive information. Some data points that can be used to implement identification of data through mosaic practices can be remarkably slight, sparse, and seemingly of no value in isolation. Each iterative cycle of data merging under the mosaic effect refines user profiles further, making future data aggregation more effective and granular. Micro-data, when combined with other more established and robust datasets exposes the previously unseen connections.

While potentially beneficial for public health analysis, such as tracking flu outbreaks, the mosaic effect also introduces risks, like revealing oil and gas transport routes through innocuous datasets. Although shared data structures improve accessibility and analysis, they simultaneously increase the risk of classified information being inadvertently exposed through data spillage. In the context of artificial intelligence, the mosaic effect has been identified as a catalyst for advanced fraud techniques by enabling the re-identification of individuals across online, physical, and bio-metric domains.

Mosaics of personal data present not only individual privacy risks but also national security concerns, as adversaries may exploit aggregated, seemingly innocuous information to identify strategic vulnerabilities across political, institutional, and geopolitical domains. Mosaic risks extend beyond classified government data, encompassing commercial threats such as the re-identification of anonymized personally identifiable information through dataset fusion.

The expression "mosaic effect" has recently entered confidentiality scholarship to describe aggregation-based re-identification threats. The mosaic effect can emerge when behavioral and identifying records—harmless in isolation—are computationally merged to re-identify individuals.

Concerns about mosaic effects were raised in 1973 when the U.S. Department of Health, Education and Welfare (HEW) warned about bureaucratic "technicians as record keepers" who could use computer technology to invade individual privacy. HEW officials warned that structural inter-agency sharing could promote indiscriminate scrutiny of citizens' private lives. In 1974, Senator Sam Ervin warned that the combination of mass data collection and political discretion created a systemic threat to privacy requiring congressional restraint. Historian Richard H. Immerman described the mosaic effect and theory as, "if you can find A, somehow you can connect the dots to a really big Z."

== Analysis and debate ==
Some commentary emphasizes the contradiction between public demands for privacy and widespread participation in data-reliant systems. In The New Yorker, William Brennan criticized government reliance on the mosaic effect, calling it a "precept that the intelligence community often invokes in the alleged and legally tenuous interest of national security". Federal privacy practices have often relied on informal discretion by government personnel rather than enforceable systemic constraints. The mosaic theory has been described as the idea that large-scale and long-running data collection reveals personal details in qualitatively different ways than isolated observations, requiring a distinct legal approach for "big data" surveillance.

Contemporary policy debates frequently hinge on concerns related to privacy, even when not explicitly stated. Some scholars have noted a paradox in privacy discourse, as society simultaneously expresses concern over both excessive and insufficient privacy. Media outlets have characterized recent years as periods of increasing exposure and weakening privacy norms. Rather than restricting data collection itself, some frameworks prioritize assessing the risk of harm and potential misuse for the individual. Proponents of open data emphasize the constructive potential of the mosaic effect to generate novel insights by linking datasets across domains.

Academic journals and funding agencies increasingly require that researchers share supporting data, and government bodies regularly publish datasets as part of open data efforts. Because most research data are not regulated by comprehensive federal standards, questions persist about whether de-identification measures like HIPAA Safe Harbor provide adequate privacy protection in these circumstances. This risk persists even when explicit identifiers are removed, and is amplified when external datasets are combined.

Contrasting past doctrines of "practical obscurity" with modern surveillance, Paul Rosenzweig noted that "GPS systems are much much cheaper than having officers tail a suspect." Rosenzweig cited DOJ v. Reporters Committee for Freedom of the Press to illustrate the Court's earlier endorsement of "practical obscurity", in which a FOIA request for a compiled database of public records was rejected 9–0. Quoting Justice Alito in United States v. Jones, Rosenzweig emphasized that long-term digital monitoring introduces "a qualitative difference" in surveillance capability beyond what was possible in analog settings.

== Finance ==
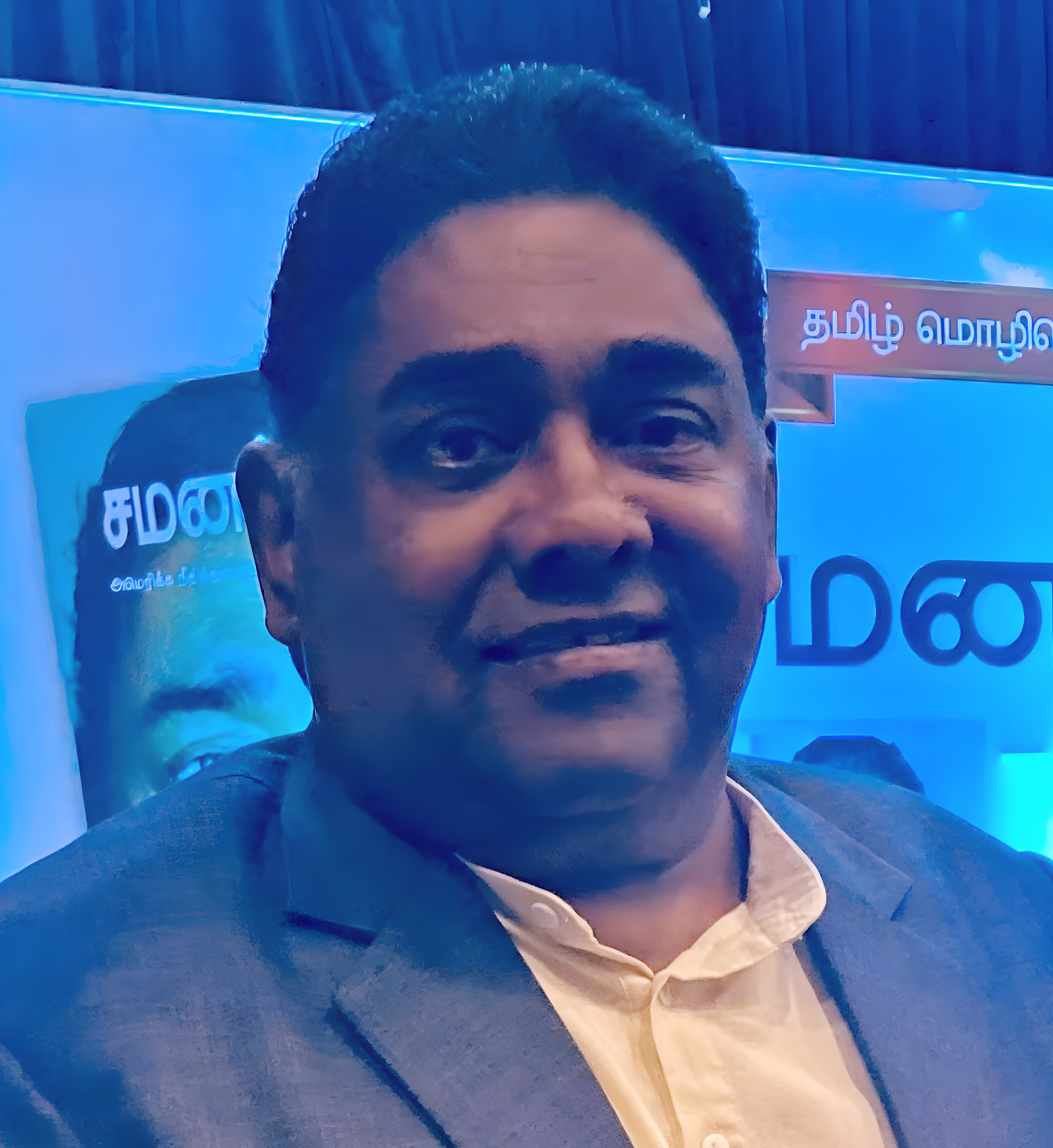
Raj Rajaratnam notably attempted to use a mosaic-based defense against insider trading allegations in the case of SEC v. Rajaratnam.

Mosaic theory in finance describes a method of evaluating securities by synthesizing both public and non-public, material and non-material information. Legal, non-material nonpublic information is combined with public sources to construct a broader understanding of a company's performance or prospects. According to the Corporate Finance Institute, this technique is designed to reveal a security's underlying value through a more comprehensive analysis. Some analysts refer to this approach as the 'scuttlebutt method,' which may include seeking insights from within a company provided those insights are not material.

Under United States securities law, the use of mosaic theory is legal so long as none of the information used meets the threshold of being both material and nonpublic. Because mosaic theory sources may leverage non-public information, this can lead to legal risks in finance domains where use of such information can have unique restrictions.

In some contexts, channel checks and similar supply-chain inquiries are used to gather inputs for mosaic theory analysis. Examples of valid data inputs under mosaic theory include company reports, employee sentiment, social media, and analyst insights. Use of the mosaic theory as a defense in insider trading cases is legally precarious, as courts scrutinize the nature of the information assembled and its potential materiality.

== Infrastructure ==
The mosaic effect has affected how infrastructure systems are designed, monitored, and secured, as data aggregation across sectors exposes operational, environmental, and national security risks. Surveillance mosaics have enabled adversaries to model nuclear facilities, while benign engineering records and satellite imagery have revealed logistical patterns in transportation, agriculture, and industrial controls. Legal and technical frameworks increasingly treat infrastructure datasets not as standalone disclosures but as components of larger analytic tapestries vulnerable to reassembly and exploitation.

=== Agriculture and food supply ===
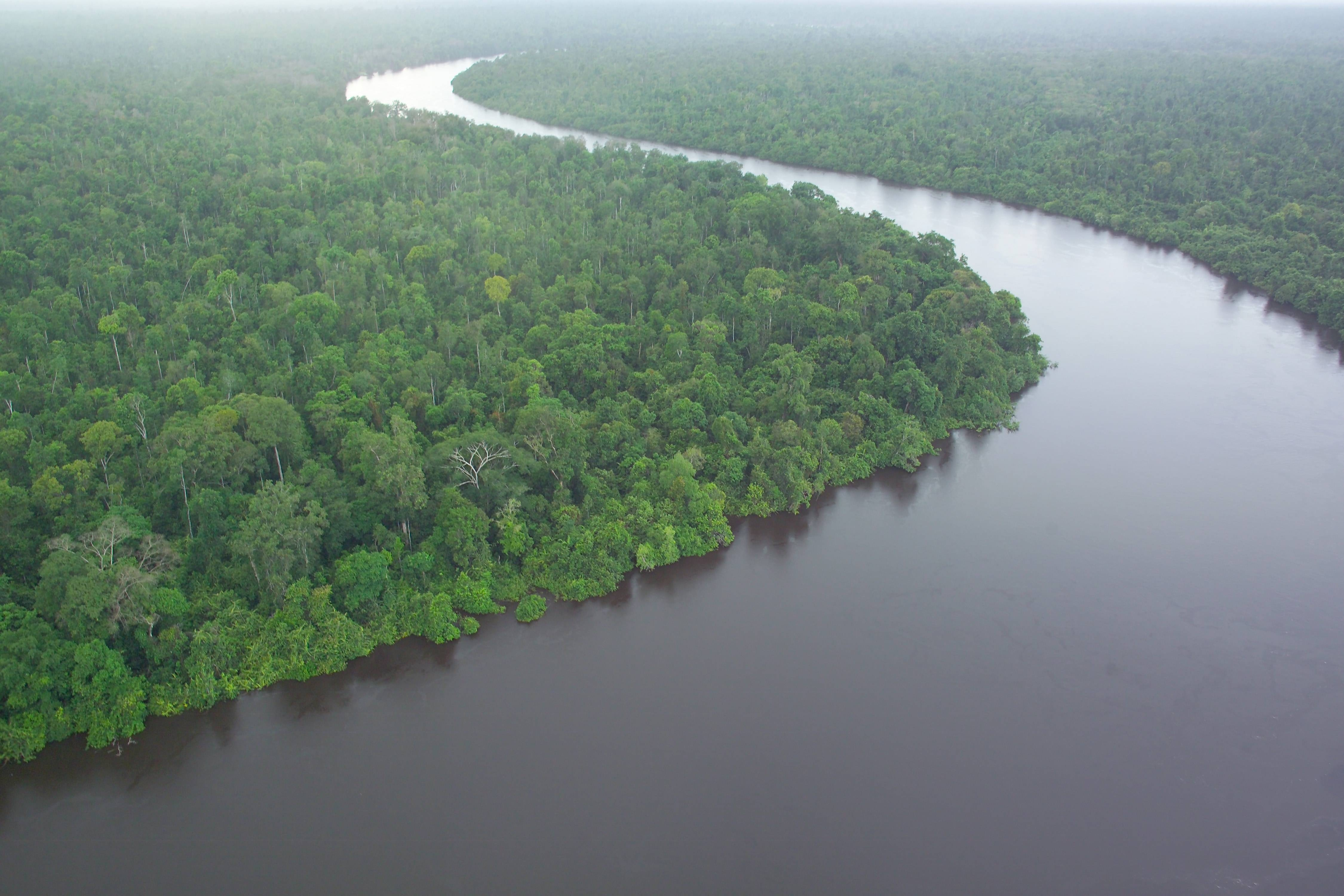
The Borneo peat swamp forests in Indonesia were studied in the context of aggregate-mosaic data to research deforestation.

In environmental monitoring, researchers have adapted mosaic concepts to study land cover changes linked to agriculture, logging, and deforestation. One such method, described by Obbink et al. (2004) as the aggregate-mosaic theory, applies spatial pattern analysis to satellite imagery to detect transitions in vegetation and land use over time. Their 2004 study of Indonesian rainforest used land cover mosaic classification to distinguish forest, shrubland, and agricultural encroachment, demonstrating that landscape fragmentation and vegetation shifts can be tracked even when total forest area appears unchanged.

=== Electric grid and energy ===
Legal scholars and courts have increasingly recognized that metadata, including electricity usage records, can constitute a mosaic capable of revealing private household routines.

In Naperville Smart Meter Awareness v. City of Naperville, the United States Court of Appeals for the Seventh Circuit held that collecting 15-minute electricity usage data constituted a search of the home under the Fourth Amendment, relying on Carpenter v. United States and the mosaic theory to argue that such data enables inferences about private activity inside the home. Carpenter marked a constitutional shift by embracing the mosaic theory, which may significantly influence how data is protected in smart cities. Rosenzweig argued that rejecting mosaic theory in Carpenter would leave the Court with a binary choice: either fully reject or fully apply privacy protections to all third-party data.

=== Healthcare and public health ===
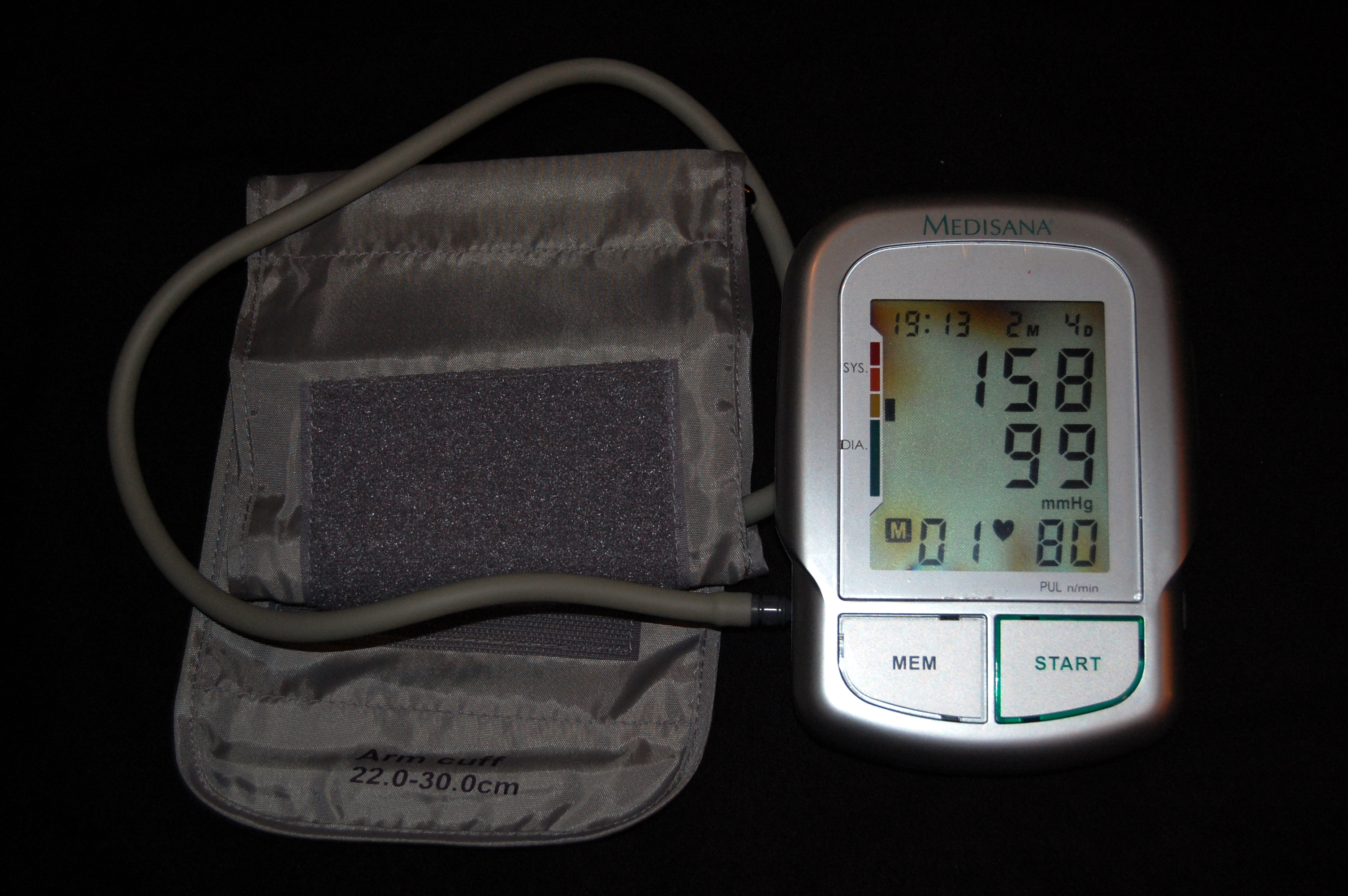
Hypertension in the medical field has been studied from the point of view of mosaic concepts.

In the medical context, versions of the mosaic effect and theory have been proposed to examine hypertension causes, the evolution of coronavirus, and the treatment experiences of minority ethnic women. A qualitative study published in BMC Public Health used grounded theory methodology to analyze the maternity care experiences of minority ethnic women in the United Kingdom. Through constant comparison of interviews, the researchers identified repeating data patterns across participants and developed an explanatory framework they referred to as the Imperfect Mosaic. The patient experiences were found to echo those previously reported by maternity care professionals, particularly in relation to race and ethnicity in the NHS.

A study in Virus Evolution applies co-evolutionary mosaic theory to identify regions—particularly in Southeast Asia and Central Africa—where bat betacoronavirus dynamics heighten the risk of zoonotic emergence. Another application uses the mosaic framework to explain hypertension as resulting from multiple interdependent causes, including salt intake and inflammation. The updated model places dietary salt and immune system inflammation at the center of the mosaic, influencing nearly all other contributing factors to hypertension. This re-frames hypertension as an emergent condition shaped by connected biological systems, rather than a linear sequence of causes.

The World Health Organization's 2023 report "Crafting the mosaic": A framework for resilient surveillance for respiratory viruses of epidemic and pandemic potential calls for identifying and securing medium- to long-term resources at national, regional and global levels to underpin its mosaic of complementary surveillance approaches. The report called for all countries to establish mosaics of fit-for-purpose surveillance systems for monitoring of respiratory pathogens with epidemic or pandemic potential. Each surveillance approach is framed by the WHO as an individual mosaic tile, that need resiliency improvements globally to handle future public health incidents.

=== Industrial control systems ===
In one of the most cited real-world examples, researchers were able to deduce the internal configuration of Iran's Natanz nuclear enrichment facility using photographs from a 2008 presidential visit and cascade models visible on SCADA displays. Security expert Ralph Langner linked these visual cues to the structure encoded in the Stuxnet malware, illustrating how seemingly innocuous information revealed through images allowed adversaries to reconstruct operational architectures.

== Privacy ==
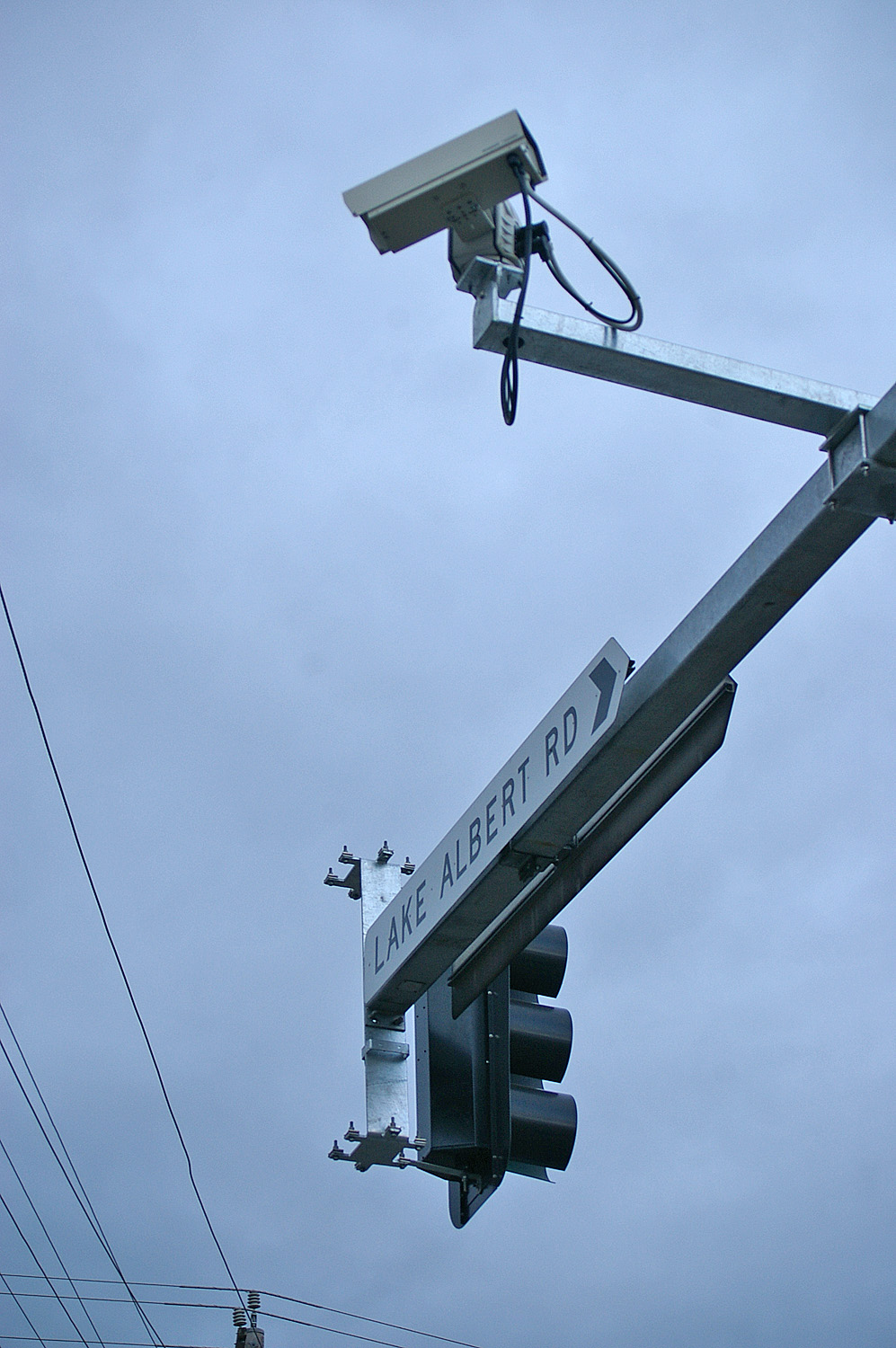
Cameras mounted on poles collecting data from public spaces have been identified as a privacy concern under mosaic concepts.

The mosaic effect has impacts on privacy. Legal scholars have proposed the mosaic theory as a means of identifying unconstitutional surveillance practices that rely on prolonged data accumulation rather than single intrusions. The risk of identification through the mosaic effect increases as more data becomes available online, particularly when data brokers collect and sell information that can be linked across sources. Privacy protections may be inadequate when public data is recombined in ways that expose sensitive patterns. Mosaicking carries the risk of exposing personally identifiable data, particularly when sensitive datasets are involved.

Public reactions to data use often depend more on perceived outcomes than on formal privacy safeguards. Aggregating discrete, publicly available data points can infringe on individual privacy by revealing sensitive personal information that none of the points would disclose in isolation. Seemingly harmless fragments of personal data can, when linked across platforms and time, form these mosaics that exposes detailed insights into an individual's routines, relationships, mental health, and private life well beyond what any single detail would reveal.

The United Nations Office on Drugs and Crime observed that metadata, though often dismissed as non-sensitive in isolation, poses acute privacy risks when accumulated, enabling detailed inferences about individuals' lives through patterns undetectable in any single data point. Paul Rosenzweig of Lawfare analogized the mosaic effect to aggregation that produces exponential informational value, stating "1+1+1 equals 17", to emphasize how seemingly benign data points can yield complex insights when combined. The United Nations' Centre for Humanitarian Data warns that even anonymized datasets, when aggregated, can enable re-identification of vulnerable populations through the mosaic effect. The Centre outlines four types of mosaic-based attacks: database cross-match, specific individual match, arbitrary individual match, and group-level targeting—each with distinct goals and risks.

These digital mosaics include information about transactions, communications, locations, and relationships, collected through routine interactions. Identifiers such as names, pseudonyms, and digital traces that are not only self-generated but also co-constructed through engaging with systems, institutions, and other people—together forming a collaborative mosaic of digital identity. Personal data also includes content shared by others—such as social media tags, public records, workplace profiles, or bystander videos—that, while seemingly harmless alone, collectively revealing sensitive details through aggregation.

Legal scholar Benjamin Wittes argues that traditional understandings of privacy are insufficient to capture the risks posed by aggregated personal data. He describes the modern data environment as a mosaic of digital fingerprints encompassing nearly every aspect of human life. Wittes identifies behavioral and targeted advertising as private-sector counterparts to government data-mining, raising similar concerns under databuse logic.

=== Advertising/behavioral targeting ===
Personal data is used to build detailed identity portraits for purposes ranging from criminal activity to targeted advertising.

=== Anonymization ===
Removing explicit identifiers from datasets does not guarantee anonymity, as individuals can often be re-identified by linking demographic details with external information. The publication of beneficial ownership data in public records increases the risk of re-identification, as the mosaic effect allows the combination of anonymized or de-identified datasets from different sources to reveal individual identities. Aggregating beneficial ownership data with information from social media and location metadata can expose individuals to security threats, including risks such as kidnapping and extortion. Combinations like ZIP code, gender, and date of birth can uniquely identify the majority of U.S. residents, showing that anonymized data is still vulnerable to the mosaic effect. Location data spanning two to three months can enable analytic programs to identify a person's home or workplace, while a single day's data lacks predictive value. In this research, Latanya Sweeney discovered 87 percent of Americans could be uniquely identified by their zip code, combined with only gender and date of birth. Predictive analytics can identify sensitive locations such as stash houses from three months of geolocation data, exemplifying the mosaic effect in action. Scholars have warned that aggregated surveillance data can retrospectively reconstruct an individual's movements and behavior over time—a concern described as the "time-machine" problem.

Even datasets that have been anonymized or pseudonymized can result in the exposure of identity traits when combined with auxiliary data, posing political and physical risks in fragile contexts. Empirical research demonstrates that it is possible to assemble a comprehensive profile of individuals by linking information from multiple government sources, illustrating the operational risks associated with the mosaic effect. The wide scale collection of big data makes it unrealistic for individuals to know what is being gathered about them. Rosenzweig termed big data surveillance "dataveillance", characterizing it as a novel form of knowledge creation through aggregation, distinct from individual surveillance events. Even when privacy techniques such as k-anonymity are used to group records and mask identifying details, the process is vulnerable if data publishers fail to anticipate which attributes can be linked with external information. Seemingly neutral identifiers, such as national ID or social security numbers, may enable the extraction of sensitive information when combined with additional datasets, due to structural properties embedded within those identifiers.

Additional releases, changes to published datasets, or unforeseen auxiliary data can compromise anonymity, allowing individuals to be re-identified through mosaic-style analysis. Public demonstrations of the mosaic effect highlight its threat to data anonymization practices and underscore the need for secure research pathways that protect user identities while supporting AI development, according to Abhishek Gupta. Researchers successfully identified Netflix users in the Netflix Prize dataset by combining it with public Internet Movie Database (IMDb) information, enabling the inference of political preferences and other sensitive attributes. In another incident, researchers were able to combine a Massachusetts hospital discharge database with public voter databases and previously breached and leaked AOL user information to identify local medical patients. An executive from AOL was forced to resign and a research team was fired due to public outcry after it was revealed that client data could be used in such reconstructed ways to identify people.

=== Automatic number-plate recognition ===
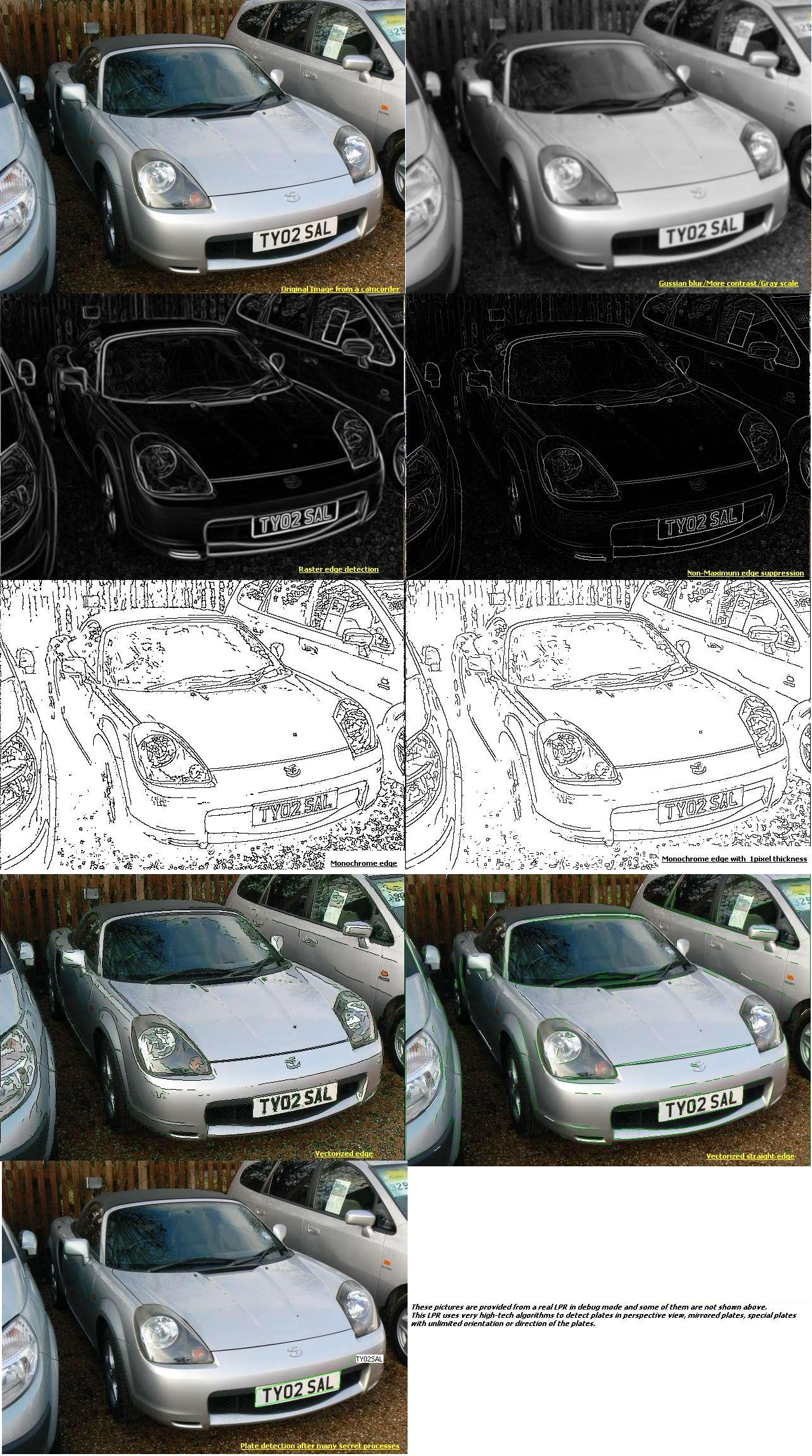
An example of an automatic number-plate recognition process identifying a vehicle.

Automatic number-plate recognition (ANPR) refers to systems that combine high-speed cameras with optical character recognition to automatically detect, photograph, and convert license plates into machine-readable text for use in applications like tolling, vehicle screening, and traffic monitoring. First articulated in United States v. Maynard (D.C. Cir. 2012) and later applied to ANPR in Commonwealth v. McCarthy (Mass. 2016), the mosaic theory holds that aggregating individually lawful location reads—whether GPS pings or license-plate scans—can collectively invade a reasonable expectation of privacy.

Although not originally designed to identify individuals, ANPR technologies have drawn legal and privacy scrutiny since the 1990s as agencies increasingly linked license plate data with third-party records and retained it over time, raising concerns about surveillance, misuse, and personal re-identification. Critics have argued that fixed-location surveillance, such as pole cameras, can expose personal routines and associations in ways comparable to mobile tracking. Mosaic theory can render previously lawful surveillance retrospectively unconstitutional; for example, McCarthy suggested that tracking periods under two months were permissible but one year would not.

In a report authored by the Texas A&M Transportation Institute with the Transportation Research Board of the National Academies of Sciences, Engineering, and Medicine, they found that aggregating discrete surveillance data points such as travel patterns from license plate tracking may collectively constitute an unconstitutional search. License plate numbers, though not personally identifiable on their own, can become PII when linked with contextual metadata or external databases such as department of motor vehicles records.

The mosaic theory offers no objective threshold for when aggregated data becomes a search, leading to arbitrary, case-by-case rulings. Groups such as the American Civil Liberties Union have warned that aggregating long-term license plate records could expose intimate personal behaviors, affiliations, or routines, especially when datasets are shared or retained indefinitely. Anonymization of license plate data may not prevent re-identification, particularly when datasets are linked to external sources, increasing privacy risks. Tracey v. State (Fla. 2014) held that the mosaic theory's ad hoc, case-by-case scrutiny of cell-site data is unworkable and undermines law-enforcement planning.

=== Cellular, data and internet services ===
Data brokers and aggregators assemble information from disparate sources to create high-definition mosaic portraits of individuals, raising the risk of profiling and digital exposure. Immigration enforcement relies on such aggregated data—including utility accounts and driver's license records, supplied by commercial providers to track, locate, and build digital dossiers on individuals who may have attempted to obscure their identities. Terabytes of personal data are traded on public marketplaces, providing raw inputs that can be aggregated into mosaic-style identity profiles. Some of this data is disclosed voluntarily, often in exchange for minor conveniences or benefits. Data brokers actively exploit the mosaic effect by linking disjointed datasets using unique attribute groupings, especially after major breaches, effectively "unlocking" new identification possibilities. Aggregation of third-party records from search queries to application usage logs creates centralized profiles that the government can access with a single request, yielding more comprehensive personal insights than traditional segmented requests.

Digital rights advocate Samantha Floreani explained that the mosaic effect causes individual risk to compound with each successive aggregation of data, as personal details can be reassembled using a common identifier such as an email address. The volume of data held by technology companies enables prosecutors to extract incriminating details from digital histories that were never intended for legal scrutiny. Some of this data is disclosed voluntarily, often in exchange for minor conveniences or benefits.

Gaps in a user's location history—such as those triggered by deletion policies—can themselves be used as circumstantial evidence in legal proceedings. This information is frequently shared with the expectation that it will be analyzed to reveal patterns about individuals. Mosaic theory extends beyond GPS tracking to modern telecommunications and Internet services, where providers' centralized records of location, communications, and usage data can be disclosed under the Stored Communications Act by court order or subpoena, enabling the government to assemble revealing mosaics of private lives. The approach re-frames surveillance law by treating continuous or repeated data collection as a single, holistic search rather than a series of isolated intrusions. Writing in Iowa Law Review, Jesse Woo analogizes the mosaic theory debate to the Sorites Paradox, arguing that incremental data collection may seem innocuous until it accumulates to a revealing whole—paralleling concerns over how much data constitutes a privacy harm. Continuous cell site location tracking can pinpoint an individual's presence within 'ordinarily and hitherto private enclave[s]'—including specific rooms—and associate them with others over time, yielding an unprecedentedly detailed portrait of personal movements.

=== Employment ===
The aggregation of personal data across platforms and time can intensify visibility by creating unintended overlaps between private and professional domains, such that, for example, a person living with cancer seeking employment may face potential discrimination if a prospective employer views their publicly accessible social media, leading to implicit bias despite their qualifications. This data can expose insights into an individual's routines, relationships, emotional state, mental health, and cross boundaries between personal and professional life via aggregation.

In a widely cited real-world demonstration, medical records for Massachusetts state employees—originally believed to be anonymous—were linked to individuals by matching demographic attributes from health data with information available in voter registration lists. This process enabled re-identification of named individuals and sensitive details, including the sitting governor, despite the absence of direct identifiers in the released medical dataset.

=== Health analytics ===
A 2017 study found that combining de-identified health research data with external sources, such as housing characteristics and public records, significantly increased the risk of re-identifying individuals even when the data met HIPAA Safe Harbor requirements. They used a combination of published demographic data and environmental measurements, such as fluoranthene levels, to computationally separate study participants by community in a de-identified dataset. By matching the patterns found in external sources and the dataset, they successfully identified which records corresponded to residents of specific towns.

Individual genetic markers that appear non-identifying in isolation may, when aggregated with other datasets, reveal sensitive personal information—raising concerns about genetic intimacy and the risks associated with storing such data in forensic or biomedical databases.

=== Humanitarian aid ===
Humanitarian and social protection data, when merged with existing information sources, can unintentionally expose sensitive insights through the mosaic effect, raising concerns about beneficiary safety and privacy. Attempts to anonymize humanitarian data may prove insufficient, as advances in re-identification techniques enable the reconstruction of sensitive identities by correlating seemingly anonymized datasets. Humanitarian data governance bodies have called for mitigation strategies that include both technical tools such as Privacy-enhancing technologies (PETs) and procedural steps like ecosystem mapping. An analysis of 400 humanitarian datasets found over 90% shared fields with at least one other dataset, illustrating widespread potential for mosaic-style re-identification.

Edward Millett, writing for Security and Human Rights, provides the example of armed actors using publicly available but separately anonymized datasets—such as a humanitarian map of refugee camps and an NGO's activity updates—to triangulate the location of demobilized child soldiers. In this scenario, while the locations of camps are public, the presence of former child soldiers is deliberately obscured; however, another organization known for working with child soldiers is identified, through unrelated data sources, as operating at a specific camp. This enables adversaries to infer the presence of child soldiers at that location by combining the datasets.

Technologies like differential privacy and federated learning are highlighted as methods to preserve data utility for humanitarian planning while reducing risks of identity disclosure. Humanitarian datasets often include telecommunications records, mobile money data, geospatial information, and social media activity, all of which can pose re-identification risks when aggregated. Despite no documented cases of mosaic-related harm in humanitarian operations, data withholding may also cause harm by delaying life-saving responses. Although documented cases of harm remain rare, the potential consequences of mosaic re-identification are considered sufficiently serious to justify proactive mitigation by policymakers and data controllers.

=== Religious privacy ===
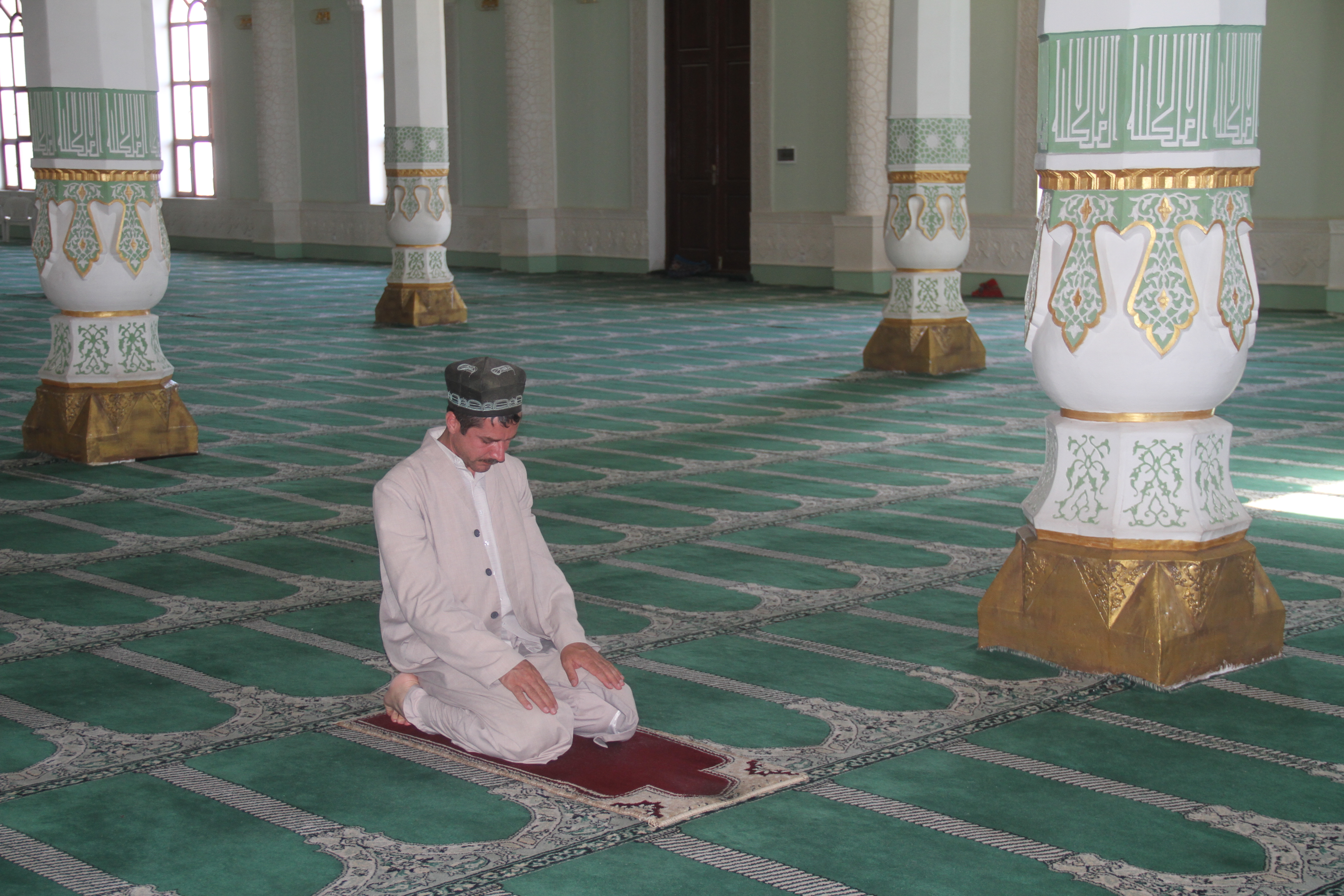
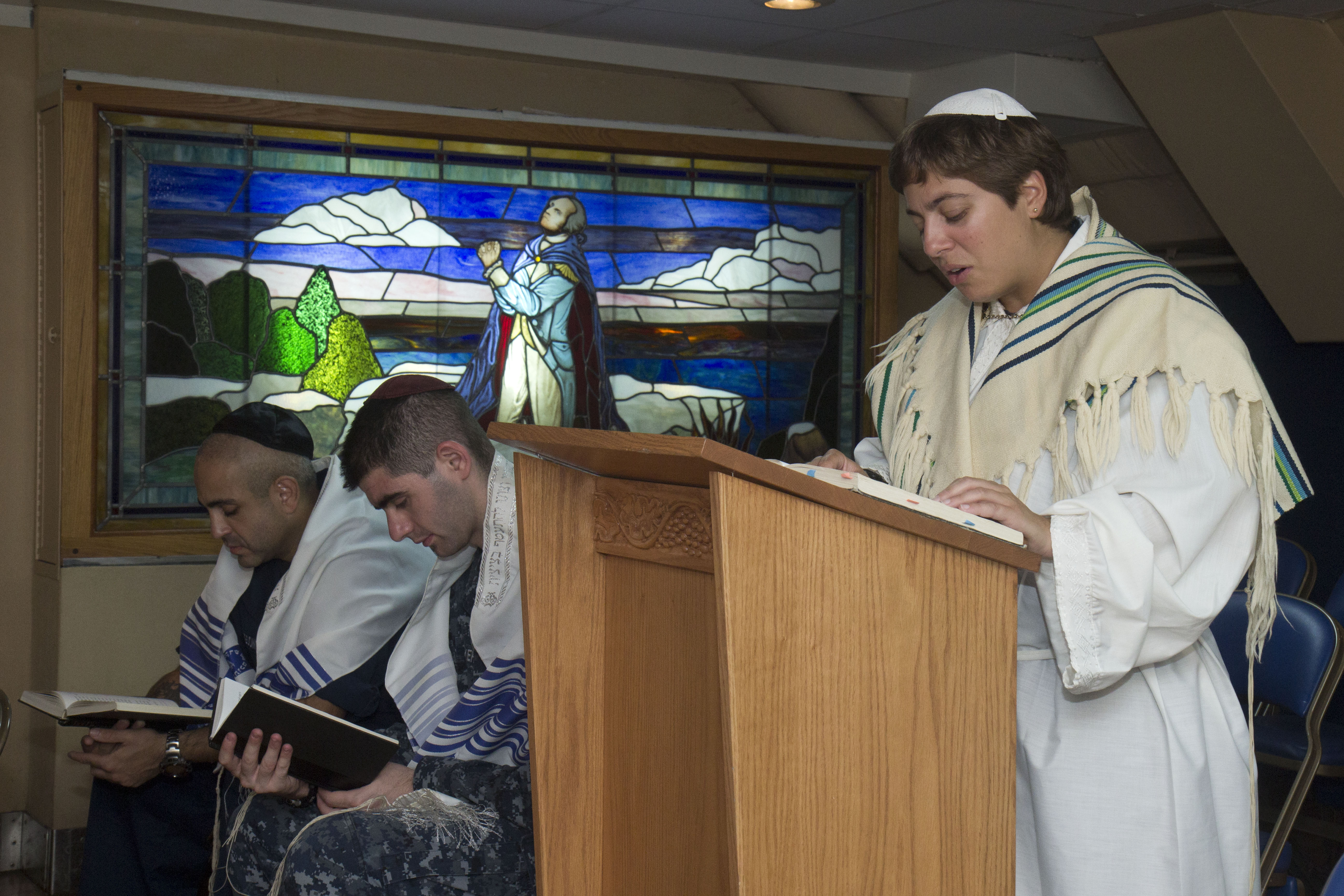
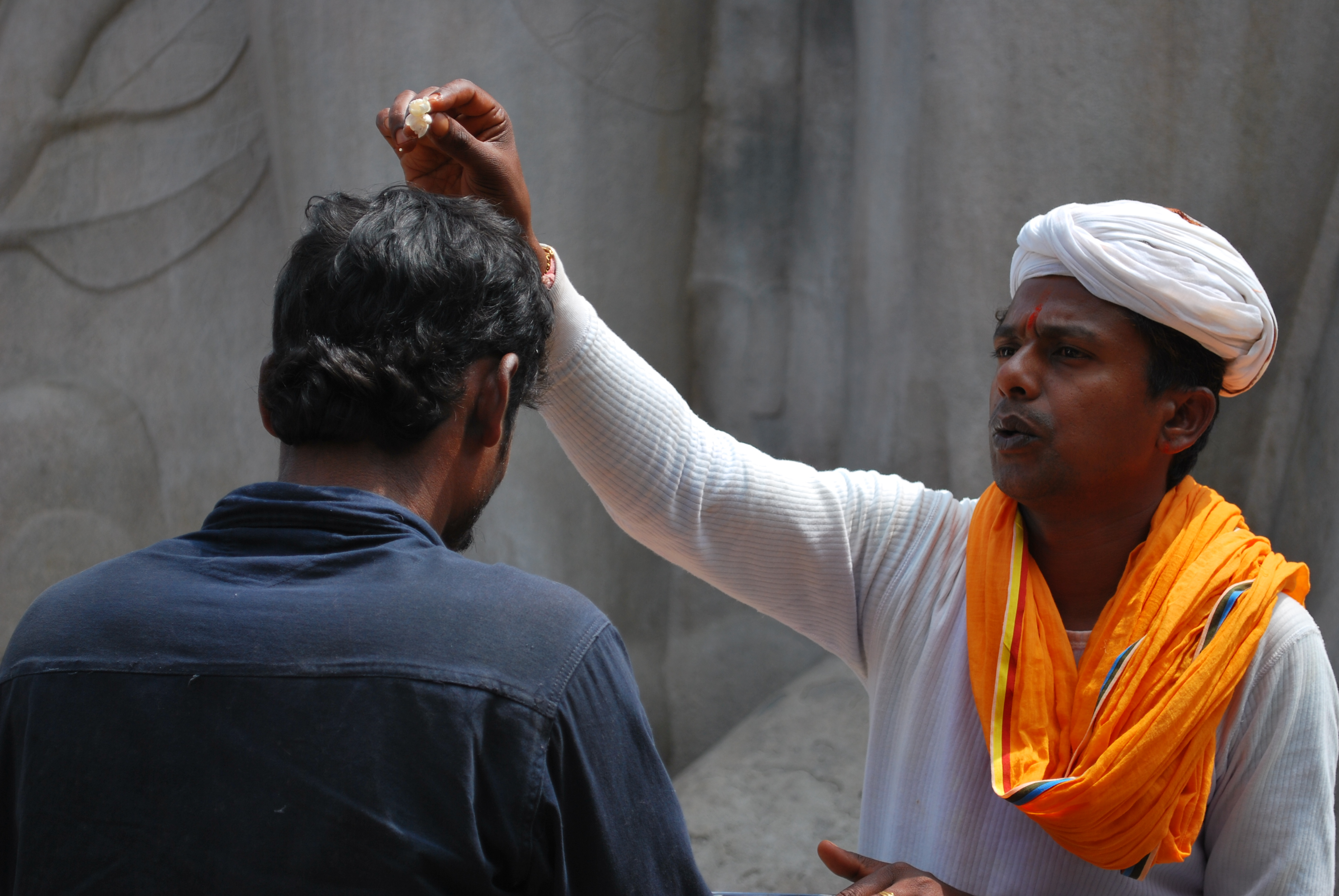
Mosaic effects can be used to identify personal traits, like religious affiliation, based on data seemingly unrelated to religion.

In a real-world case study, mosaicking prayer schedules with transit data enabled the identification of individuals by inferring religious practices from non-identifying datasets. Even when datasets are scrubbed of direct identifiers, patterns revealed through mosaicking can highlight characteristics of protected or vulnerable groups, demonstrating the limits of traditional anonymization. Before 9/11, courts rarely invoked First or Fourth Amendment limits on religious‐minority surveillance, but the later rise of the "First Amendment criminal procedure" doctrine alongside the mosaic theory established that online communications carry enforceable privacy expectations and that their monitoring can chill religious expression.

Under the mosaic concepts, privacy harms stem not from any single social media post but from aggregating a user's full digital presence over time, since combined data reveal more than isolated items do. Metadata such as timestamps, locations, and communication logs can become vectors of identification in humanitarian contexts, even when message content is never accessed. Transaction records, when cross-referenced with publicly available geographic or temporal data, may inadvertently expose individual religious behaviors or affiliations. In refugee camps and similar high-density environments, the risk of mosaic re-identification increases because multiple datasets often contain overlapping personal details.

Purchase histories can act as proxies for religious or cultural identity, especially when combined with other behavioral or locational data. When combined with breached service data, the mosaic effect enables the construction of virtual avatars of real individuals, integrating digital, genetic, and physical identity traits for use in fraud scenarios. Mosaicked datasets can facilitate profiling, enabling adversarial actors to infer political or ideological associations and potentially use that information to discriminate or cause harm. Data enrichment firms sell access to compiled databases containing personal information such as religious beliefs, education levels, and interests, enabling mosaic-based profiling by third parties. Most users expect only friends or limited audiences to see individual posts, not law enforcement dragnetting every message indefinitely—a practice where mosaicked data itself constitutes a distinct privacy injury.

=== Reproductive rights ===
After the repeal of Roe v Wade in the United States, medical and behavioral records—such as period-tracking data, private messages, and search queries—have become prosecutorial targets in post-Roe data investigations. The longstanding academic debate over digital privacy abruptly became a live political and legal crisis following the reversal of Roe, with consequences for millions. Anti-abortion activists are now expected to pursue legislation mandating longer data retention periods, intensifying conflicts with technology firms. Location data is only one piece of a vast mosaic of digital information now being targeted by abortion-ban enforcers seeking to reconstruct personal behavior. A comprehensive federal privacy statute could establish uniform rules for digital data governance as states pursue more aggressive data-based abortion prosecutions.

== United States government ==
Federal agencies have adopted safeguards to prevent the "mosaic effect", whereby combining multiple publicly released datasets could inadvertently reveal personal identities. Law enforcement agencies combine data from various sources to infer individuals' locations and routines, even when direct identifiers are unavailable or have been deliberately obscured. The U.S. government first became aware of the mosaic effect's risks six months after the launch of Data.gov, when security agencies flagged concerns about compilation. As open-data initiatives expand, U.S. departments routinely vet releases to ensure that new datasets cannot be cross-linked with existing information to expose individuals. Seemingly innocuous datasets could be cross-referenced to track government vehicle movements or infer agency operations. Predicting whether any given data set contributes to a harmful mosaic effect remains an inexact science, with most agencies unaware of possible combinations. Analysts have shown how open-source photos from official state media enabled accurate modeling of Iranian centrifuge cascades, later found to match cyber sabotage payloads. The case is frequently cited in support of U.S. policies restricting mosaic-style data compilation across government disclosures.

Most federal agencies maintain extensive internal datasets, much of which may be sensitive depending on agency scope and exposure. Advancements in data analytics and the proliferation of open datasets have prompted agencies to conduct ongoing risk assessments aimed at forestalling mosaic-driven disclosures. Government data release policies have struggled to anticipate all future misuse scenarios involving aggregated datasets. One approach to mitigating classification by compilation has been to ignore aggregation risks in the absence of explicit Security Classification Guides governing specific datasets. This strategy has proven inadequate, as it leaves certain sensitive combinations unprotected despite their aggregate risk profile. In counterterrorism contexts, public expectations often reflect a conflict between wanting stronger intelligence and opposing the data practices that enable it.

The United States Supreme Court has not formally endorsed the mosaic theory, but has applied its logic in decisions on digital surveillance. It has been proposed that the mosaic theory apply to any surveillance method capable of long-term data collection, including persistent drone or camera tracking over extended periods. The mosaic theory holds that although isolated data points may not constitute a search, their aggregation can reveal patterns so revealing that they implicate constitutional protections.

=== Agencies and mosaic ===
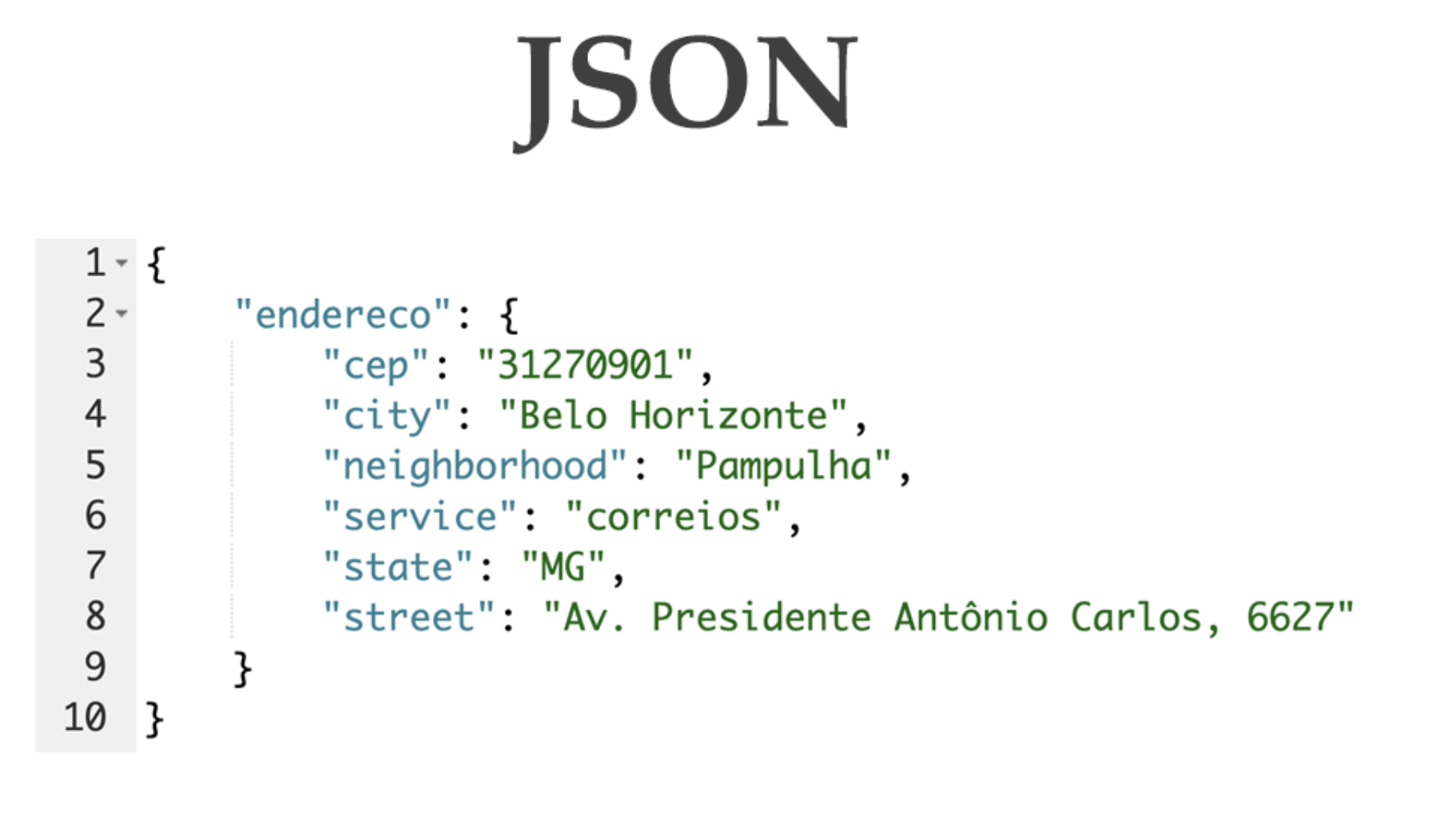
An example of basic .json, used by Data.gov.

The United States Department of Defense (DOD) utilizes shared, unclassified data repositories to consolidate relevant information for analysis and operational use. Immigration enforcement agencies draw from multiple databases—including bio-metrics, utility records, and driver's license data. These are used to piece together profiles and track individuals, often circumventing attempts to limit access to specific data sources. Although security agencies raised alarms, only one dataset out of over 90,000 on Data.gov was ever pulled back due to mosaic effect concerns. The mosaic effect was not anticipated during the original 2009 launch of Data.gov, despite its foundational role in the open government agenda. The DOD explicitly warns that modern data aggregation and correlation tools can combine unclassified data into compilations that require classification and special handling.

Elevating the classification level of an entire environment to match its most sensitive component is another method of preventing aggregation-based disclosures. This method reduces the risk of spillage but simultaneously restricts access to data, limiting usability across agencies and users. An alternative relies on individual users to maintain compliance with classification by compilation rules during data retrieval and fusion. This method burdens users with the need to internalize all relevant classification policies, limiting effective access and discouraging broad data usage.

A technical expert panel convened by HHS evaluated whether existing disclosure-limitation methods remain adequate in the face of mosaic-effect concerns or require enhancement. The phenomenon is considered a second-order effect stemming from the very design of shared data environments intended to support machine learning and related analytics. The U.S. Department of Health and Human Services has noted a lack of empirical studies quantifying mosaic-effect risks or prescribing best practices to mitigate them. At DHS, internal privacy leadership observed that agencies default to collecting all accessible data, regardless of operational necessity. Agency privacy plans sometimes outline overbroad or questionable practices that go unchallenged due to lack of public scrutiny.

Merging behavioral and identity-linked government data, even without names or unique individual data like Social Security numbers, can produce composite profiles specific enough to identify individuals or small groups, a practice already enabled by formal data-sharing agreements among agencies including the Justice Department, HUD, the IRS, the Social Security Administration, HHS, and the Defense Department. Data held by U.S. agencies can create a granular, life-spanning profile of individuals, including financial, bio-metric, familial, and even posthumous records. Facial photographs, such as those from passports, are routinely converted into algorithmic templates usable across biometric systems. Formal inter-agency agreements permit record matching across departments, including DOJ–HUD, IRS–SSA, and HHS–DoD collaborations. Government use of commercial data providers extends mosaic-style aggregation by leveraging credit histories, employment information, utility bills, and address records to reconstruct social and familial connections not visible in government files alone.

Despite the risks, Marion Royal, director of Data.gov at the General Services Administration, claimed the U.S. government had encountered few actual incidents of agencies publishing overly sensitive data. Royal described the mosaic effect as akin to assembling puzzle pieces—each harmless alone, but together exposing vulnerabilities. The ability to correlate just two data points can act as a foundation for wider inferences across massive datasets. When malicious use is theoretically possible, actual redaction due to the mosaic effect has occurred only once. The .json format used by Data.gov enabled automated aggregation, making the site a proving ground for mosaic-style recombination threats. Software services now aggregate information from thousands of public websites, social media profiles, and external databases, enabling authorities to generate risk assessments and behavioral profiles using patterns invisible in any single dataset. The spread of social media and search data, Royal argued, makes true anonymization nearly impossible, and that traditional consent-based models of privacy are outdated in a world of sensor-driven, passively collected data.

The National Oceanic and Atmospheric Administration's David McClure noted that while the mosaic effect poses risks, it also allows innovative public-private partnerships to make use of underutilized sensor data. NOAA generates over a terabyte of environmental data daily, of which only a fraction is used internally, leaving the rest vulnerable or useful depending on interpretation. McClure noted the challenge of balancing unrealized data value against unseen disclosure risks in open data systems.

=== FOIA and transparency ===
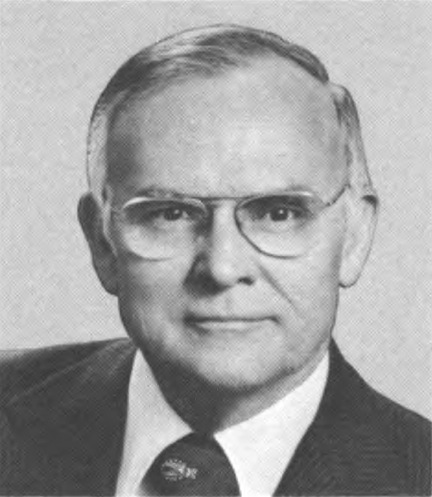
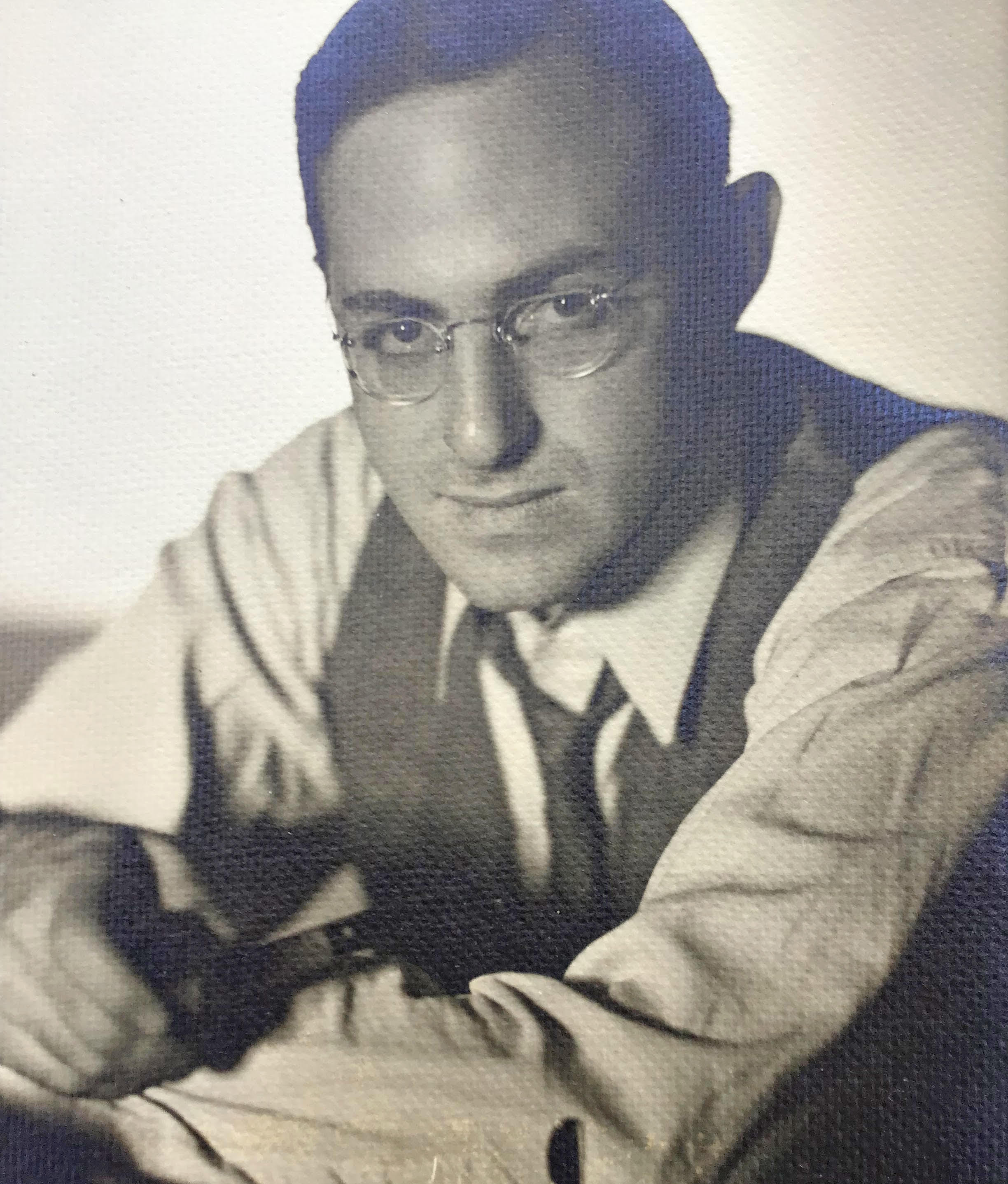
US Senator John E. Moss and journalist Jacob Scher, champions of the Freedom of Information Act.

Under Executive Order 12,356 in 1982, President Reagan formally integrated mosaic theory into U.S. classification policy, authorizing the withholding of information based on potential cumulative threats from aggregated disclosures, even if individual pieces appeared innocuous. This contrasted sharply with earlier policies, particularly under Truman and Eisenhower, who mandated classifying documents strictly on their independent content rather than their combined implications.

President Reagan briefly extended the mosaic theory beyond classification law through a short-lived campaign targeting unclassified data in private databases, before it faded from executive discourse until its revival after 9/11. During the 1980s and 1990s, the mosaic theory gained broad acceptance in FOIA national security cases across multiple federal courts, where agencies' withholding claims were routinely upheld over the objections of FOIA applicants, without detailed judicial scrutiny or engagement with potential conflicts between the theory and FOIA principles.

President Clinton's Executive Order 12958 of 1995 replaced the broader mosaic theory language from Reagan's classification policy with a more restrictive standard focused on whether compiled, unclassified information reveals a new association warranting classification, though courts largely ignored the change and continued applying earlier doctrine. The mosaic theory attained a privileged status under FOIA prior to 9/11, with courts granting agencies broad deference and rarely scrutinizing the plausibility or scope of their claims. After 9/11, the George W. Bush administration invoked the mosaic theory more frequently to expand classification and resist FOIA disclosures, leading to increased judicial scrutiny and divided views on executive secrecy. In 2013, the Obama administration through the Office of Management and Budget reiterated prior definitions of the mosaic effect in the context of government data, and required all agencies to assess and mitigate against the effect before releasing potentially sensitive data.

Matthew Connelly of Columbia University launched the Declassification Engine, a project of computer scientists, historians, and classification experts working to un-redact the black bars on redacted government documents. Connelly noted that the project's participants remained aware of the national security implications their work might raise, including concerns related to the mosaic effect.

=== Legal challenges ===
The 1977 United States Senate report on Project MKUltra. The CIA withheld some data based on mosaic theory.

Agencies routinely withheld information citing mosaics, with courts seldom scrutinizing or challenging these claims.

In CIA v. Sims (1985), the U.S. Supreme Court endorsed the mosaic theory to justify broad judicial deference under FOIA Exemption 3, allowing the CIA to withhold seemingly innocuous details about Project MKUltra on grounds that aggregated disclosures could expose intelligence sources, a rationale that has since granted the agency near-total immunity from FOIA and been broadly applied by lower courts. In Muniz v. Meese (1987), the D.C. District Court became the first to reject a mosaic theory claim, dismissing the DEA's argument that employment records could reveal sensitive operational structures, though the case had no lasting influence on mosaic theory jurisprudence.

In Center for National Security Studies v. Department of Justice (2003), the D.C. Circuit upheld the Department's refusal to disclose records under the Freedom of Information Act (FOIA) regarding individuals detained after the September 11 attacks. The district court had initially rejected the mosaic theory's relevance under FOIA Exemption 7(A), warning that its broad application risked transforming the exemption into "an exemption dragnet" for routine disclosures. The court accepted the government's argument that releasing the requested information would, when compiled, reveal "a comprehensive diagram of the law enforcement investigation after September 11".

The case marked a post-9/11 application of the mosaic theory, with the D.C. Circuit reversing a lower court and permitting the DOJ to withhold all requested information—including detainees' names and legal representation—on the grounds that even minimal disclosures could compromise ongoing investigations through aggregation. According to David E. Pozen, the D.C. Circuit's decision in the case was an extreme application of the mosaic theory, based on limited evidence and marked by judicial deference that allowed the government to withhold all detainee information despite strong public interest. The case has been cited as a turning point in national security law, illustrating how the mosaic effect and mosaic theory shaped judicial deference toward executive secrecy.

Following the split in Center for National Security Studies v. Department of Justice, related appellate cases—North Jersey Media Group v. Ashcroft (Third Circuit) and Detroit Free Press v. Ashcroft (Sixth Circuit)—also addressed the mosaic theory's use by the government to limit transparency after 9/11. The Third Circuit broadly deferred to government secrecy, effectively relinquishing judicial oversight, while the Sixth Circuit ruled in favor of greater disclosure.

The Supreme Court declined to hear North Jersey Media, and Pozen argued this division exemplifies how long-settled mosaic theory doctrine became contested during the Bush Administration's expansion of secrecy powers. The government closed 9/11-related "special interest" deportation hearings to the public and press, citing the mosaic theory to argue that disclosure could help terrorists evade detection by revealing investigative gaps. Faced with mosaic theory claims, the Third Circuit deferred to government secrecy despite acknowledging speculative risks, while the Sixth Circuit rejected broad closures as overbroad and demanded concrete evidence of harm to justify restricting public access, which Pozen said reflected a key judicial split over mosaic theory's scope after 9/11.

== See also ==
- Confidentiality
- Data aggregation
- Data re-identification
- De-identification
- Differential privacy
- Disclosure avoidance
- Information hazard
- Open data
- Open-source intelligence
- Re-identification
- Self-disclosure
- Social network analysis
