= Market moving information =

Market moving information is a term used in stock market investing, defined as information that would cause any reasonable investor to make a buy or sell decision. It is also sometimes referred to as material information.

When a public company insider fails to publicly disclose material, market moving information to everyone and only to certain parties, that is called selective disclosure, an act that is prohibited by the Securities Exchange Commission's Regulation FD.

Many types of events can be considered market moving information. A bad freeze in Florida can cause the price of orange juice to increase. An expected drought in the Midwest might cause corn or soybean prices to rise on fears of poor crop outputs and limited supplies. Statements by certain figures might also be market moving information. For instance, Elon Musk was fined by the SEC in 2018 for tweeting that he had secured investment funding sufficient to take Tesla, Inc. private, causing wild swings in the company's stock price.
