= 1948 Georgia USAF Boeing B-29 crash =

Aviation incident in Georgia, United States

1948 B-29 Waycross crash
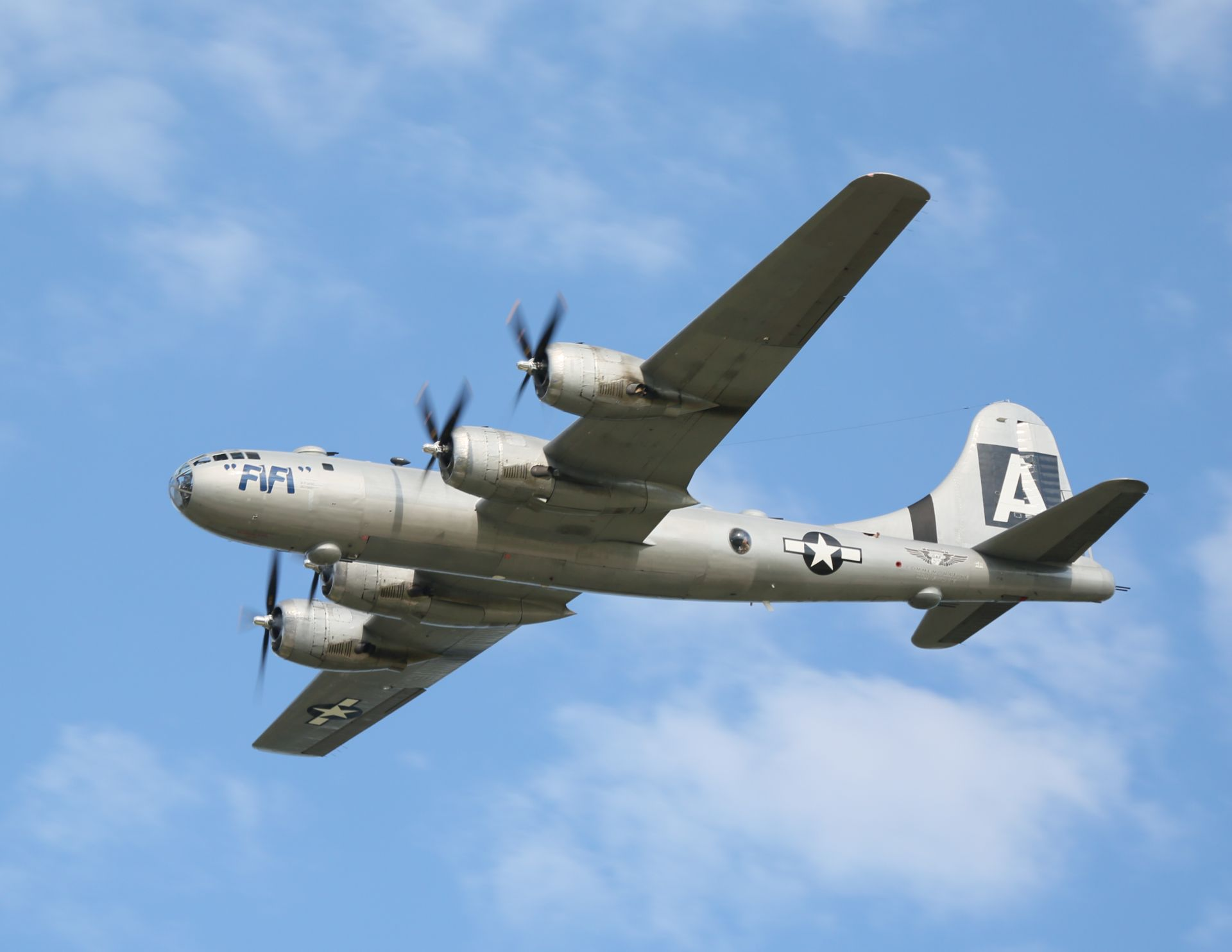
- A B-29 Superfortress similar to the accident aircraft

Accident
- Date: 6 October 1948
- Summary: Faulty maintenance
- Site: 31.1830°N 82.3685°W

Aircraft
- Aircraft type: Boeing B-29 Superfortress
- Operator: United States Air Force
- Registration: 45-21866
- Crew: 13
- Survivors: 4 (3 military, 1 civilian)

The 1948 Waycross B-29 crash occurred on 6 October 1948 when an engine fire contributed to the crash of a Boeing B-29-100-BW Superfortress bomber in Waycross, Georgia. The plane was from the 3150th Electronics Squadron, United States Air Force and had tail number 45-21866. The crash occurred during a climb to altitude from the Robins Air Force Base and killed nine of thirteen men aboard, including three RCA engineers. Four men parachuted to safety. Because the flight was a test of the "sunseeker" (a heat-seeking device later used in the AIM-9 Sidewinder missile), the federal government asserted the state secrets privilege to avoid having to provide the Air Force's accident report in a subsequent suit for damages by victims of the crash and their heirs, despite the device playing no role in the crash itself and not being referred to in the report.

== United States v. Reynolds ==
A $225,000 summary judgment against the government and for the contractor's widows was directed when the government claimed the accident report, as well as documents with surviving crewmember statements, could not be furnished "without seriously hampering national security". However, the Supreme Court overturned the judgment under state secrets privilege. Nevertheless, the Air Force agreed to pay an out-of-court settlement of $170,000. Decades later the declassified accident report indicated the cause to have been a fire and drop in manifold pressure in the number 1 engine, as well as an inadvertent feathering of the number 4 engine, which was not successfully unfeathered prior to the crash. The report indicated the cause of the fire in engine 1 could not be positively determined, but was likely to have been the result of breaks in the right exhaust collector ring. The report further stated that "the fire may have been aggravated by non-compliance with Technical Orders 01-20EJ-117 and 01-20EJ-178." It concluded that the aircraft was "not considered safe for flight" due to non-compliance with these orders. A consequent lawsuit to reopen the case claimed that the report's information about the cause was not secret and alleged a government coverup, but the case was not reopened.

== See also ==
- List of 1948 accidents and incidents involving military aircraft
