= Mosaic theory (investments) =

Financial Analysis

The mosaic theory in finance involves the use of security analyst personnel to gather information about a company or corporation to evaluate and determine its financial stability. In addition to public information available to all investors, securities analysts also have access to non-public information which the vast majority of investors do not possess. Trading based on such non-public information can be considered illegal if the information is also material, as defined by insider trading laws.

== Theory ==
Seal of the United States Securities and Exchange Commission

By gathering various non-material information, often from sources at or close to the issuing corporation, an analyst can draw useful conclusions about the current and future health of the company, allowing them to profit from transacting in shares of its stock and related derivative contracts. However, extrapolating conclusions from a "mosaic" of such bits of non-public information can be vague, sometimes leading analysts to false conclusions about the corporation. Security analysts then have to sort through the data collected and make recommendations to their clients or keep the information to themselves to use later for personal profit based on determining the underlying value of a company's securities.

== SEC and guideline ==
Since the commission's Fair Disclosure rule (Reg FD) was enacted, the viability of the mosaic theory has been retained within the United States under the Securities and Exchange Commission. Broadly speaking, the SEC requires public corporations to register their stock sales and protects investors in the municipal securities markets. Though it was not created by the Securities and Exchange Commission, it has placed a judicially imposed limitation on the information gathered by insider trading. If the U.S. Securities and Exchange Commission deems that there is illegal insider trading, they can freeze assets tied to the company's shares. The Securities and Exchange Commission explains that this nonpublic information, known as research to the security analysts, isn't banned from "disclosing a non-material piece of information to an analyst, even if, unbeknownst to the issuer, that piece helps the analyst complete a "mosaic" of information that, taken together, is material". The SEC constantly are evaluating trends and when unknown traders purchase equity call options that are millions of dollars. The SEC can freeze accounts on suspicion of illegal insider trading when the accuracy and validity of information may be incorrect within the marketplace. This had led to the legality of insider trading laws to be under intense scrutiny. Though it is legal under the United States Federal insider laws to utilize the mosaic information that is obtained by a securities analyst, it must be within the guidelines of the confidentiality that the company or corporation created. For most companies within the United States and do business with the United States, these guidelines of confidentiality are required. Some of the controls that have mitigated the potential of illegal trading within the mosaic theory include the interactions between a company and consultants, notification in connection with approved consultants, remaining alert to potential issues, compliance oversight, information barriers, and being within the SEC guidelines. These guidelines have made companies more transparent with their financial stability to the general public.

== Practical use ==
Under insider trading laws, analysts may not use material non-public information to help select their trades. But traders might be able to piece together non-material non-public information and material public information into a mosaic, which may increase in value when properly compiled and documented. The theory is also referred to more colloquially as the scuttlebutt method by Philip Fisher in Common Stocks and Uncommon Profits.

Mosaic theory involves collecting information from different sources, public and private, to calculate the value of security. Applying the mosaic theory is as much art as it is science. An analyst gleans as many pieces of information as possible, determines if they tell a story that makes sense, and decides whether to recommend a trade.

It is also a legal theory used to uphold the classification of information, holding that a collection of unclassified information might add up to a classified whole. The theory has also been applied to legal reasoning in the context of the Fourth Amendment where the continuous use of GPS surveillance was found to violate the subject's "reasonable expectation of privacy".

== Legality of the Mosaic Theory ==
Though the Supreme Court recognized the legality of the Mosaic Theory in Dirks v. SEC, the concerns have arisen with the potential of illegal insider trading happening within analysis. Analysts can take advantage of vague insider trading laws and this brings of the legality of it. Securities analysts can obtain non disclosed information from company insiders that an average investor cannot. Under insider trading law, this advantage is an unlawful method. To combat this issue, confidentiality agreements as well as operating under internal policy guidelines are in place. Section 10(b) of the Securities Exchange Act of 1934 and Exchange Act Rule 10b-5 falls under the category when unknown traders purchase equity call options that are millions of dollars.

The mosaic theory relies heavily on the U.S. economy's fluctuation and stock market. Without public corporations being transparent, the mosaic theory would be ineffective and the stock market would be vulnerable to sudden shifts as hidden information comes out. Thus, it is illegal for United States public companies to not be transparent with their corporate profitability.

== Court Cases ==
In May 2011, US District Judge Richard J. Howell sentenced Raj Rajaratnam, the founder of the Galleon Group hedge fund, to eleven years in prison who was found guilty of fourteen counts of insider trading. During the high-profile trial of investor Raj Rajaratnam, defense attorneys used the mosaic theory to argue against allegations of insider trading. These arguments were ultimately unsuccessful. Though it was ten years shorter than the requested amount of time, it constitutes as the longest prison sentence given to an insider trading case. Under the Securities Exchange Acts15 USC §78j(b) and 17 CFR §240.10b-5, Rajaratnam and other Galleon traders were convicted with fraud and conspiracy. They profited tens of millions of dollars of insider trading and based their arguments off of the mosaic theory. So far, this is the only court case that has used the mosaic theory in court to validate insider trading in the court of law.

== See also ==
- Stock valuation
- Classified information in the United States
- Freedom of Information Act (United States)
- Enron scandal
- Mosaic theory (US law)
