= Mosaic theory of the Fourth Amendment =

Legal theory about admissible evidence

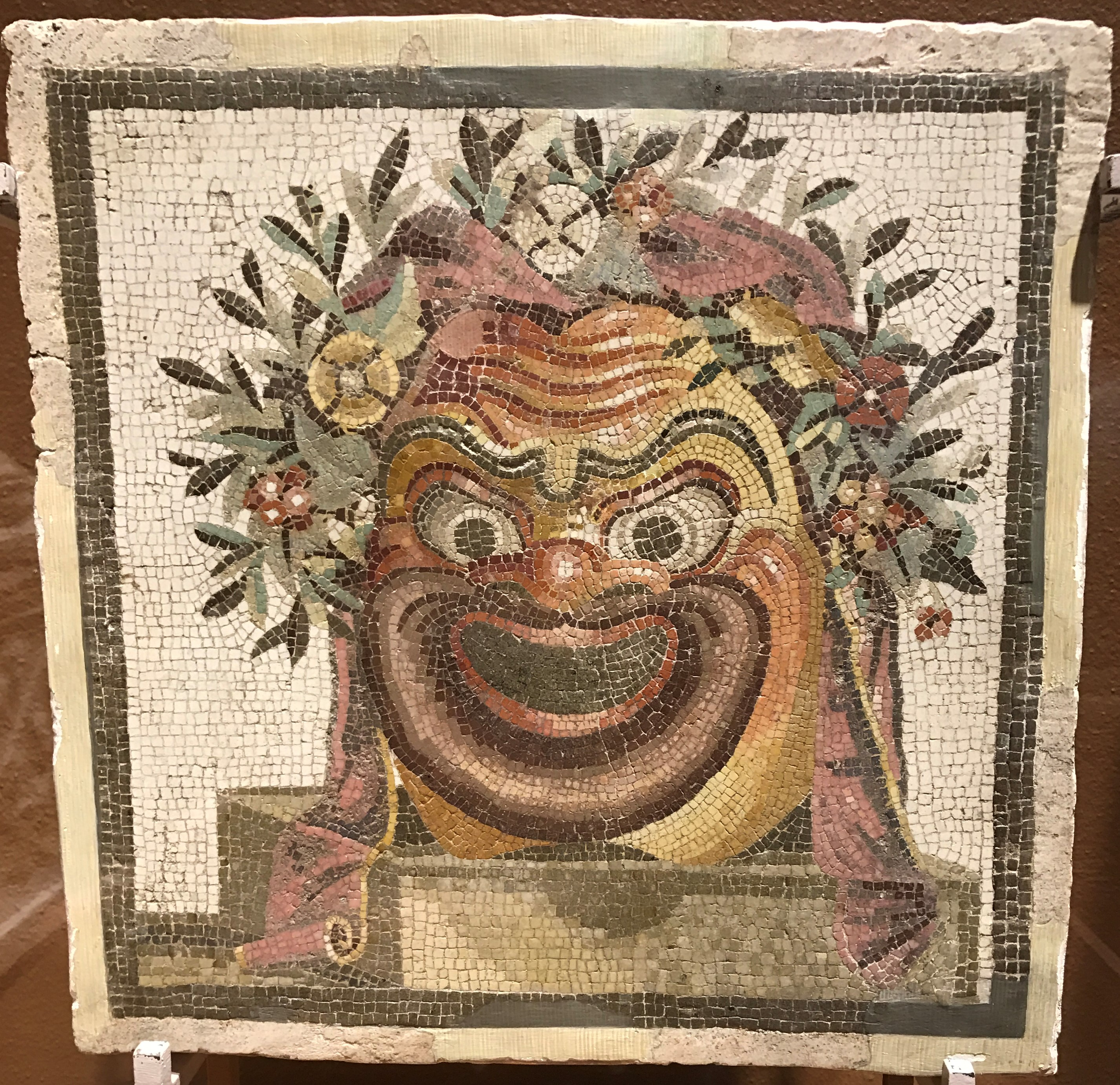
A mosaic, the artistic medium after which the doctrine is named

The mosaic theory is a legal doctrine in American courts for considering issues of information collection, government transparency, and search and seizure, especially in cases involving invasive or large-scale data collection by government entities. The theory takes its name from mosaic tile art: while an entire picture can be seen from a mosaic's tiles at a distance, no clear picture emerges from viewing a single tile in isolation. The mosaic theory calls for a cumulative understanding of data collection by law enforcement and analyzes searches "as a collective sequence of steps rather than individual steps."

The doctrine was first used in cases about national security, to deny requests for records in the 1970s under the Freedom of Information Act (FOIA), to prevent the release of a mix of individual pieces of information which were viewed as dangerous in combination. Human rights workers and legal scholars have criticized this as undermining civil rights. They argue that when government agencies claim that any scrap of information is part of a larger intelligence mosaic, those agencies get free rein to determine what of their work will be kept secret. This method is used by American intelligence analysts.

In 2012, the theory was turned around to limit government data collection. Five justices of the US Supreme Court authored concurring opinions supporting a new Fourth Amendment framework for judging whether or not an individual has been subjected to an unlawful search, in United States v. Jones (2012). Under this framework, the US government's actions should be considered collectively rather than independently for determining whether or not the acts constitute a search under the Fourth Amendment. It requires that police action is considered "over time as a collective 'mosaic' of surveillance," and allows that cumulative mosaic to qualify as a protected Fourth Amendment search, even if the individual steps that contribute to the full picture do not reach that constitutional threshold in isolation.

Critics of the Fourth Amendment use of mosaic theory argue that it is difficult to administer and inconsistent with other Fourth Amendment jurisprudence. Proponents, on the other hand, argue that mosaic theory is a much-needed development in light of new technologies that allow law enforcement officers to collect large volumes of personal data with little effort.

== History ==
=== National security origins ===
Mosaic theory first emerged as justification for US government agencies' denial of Freedom of Information Act (FOIA) requests for records, as "apparently harmless pieces of information that when assembled together could reveal a damaging picture." Its first uses were in that national security context.

In United States v. Marchetti, 466 F.2d 1309, 1318 (4th Cir. 1972), the court enjoined a former Central Intelligence Agency (CIA) employee from publishing an exposé that covered their time working at the agency. In so doing, the court stated, "the significance of one item of information may frequently depend on the knowledge of many other items of information. What may seem trivial to the uninformed, may appear of great moment to one who has a broad view of the scene and may put the questioned item of information in its proper context."

The courts went on to solidify mosaic theory in the Halkin v. Helms and Halperin v. CIA cases, in the 1970s. Since the Marchetti decision, mosaic theory remained an enduring concept in national security law. Even then, judicial understanding of when it was appropriate to heed a "mosaic" argument was unspecified. Without those guidelines, courts displayed "heightened deference" to government cases employing the theory and allowed government agencies to define both whether requested information could constitute a national security risk and whether the mosaic theory applied to a case.

Unlike other Presidents, who held that documents should be considered for release based on their content alone, not their relationship to other sources of information, mosaic theory was supported by US President Ronald Reagan. Out of fear of Russian intelligence gathering in the Cold War, he defined the use of the mosaic theory in the executive branch to obstruct the release of records under Executive Order 12,356 in 1982.

The first Supreme Court ruling on mosaic theory occurred in CIA vs. Sims in 1985. The court denied the plaintiff's request for FOIA records, stating that the CIA was best able to judge the national security risk of releasing the requested documents. With that ruling, mosaic theory became an established, precedented legal doctrine that gave intelligence agencies like the CIA "carte blanche" to deny FOIA requests.

=== Expanded use after 9/11 ===
Mosaic theory, as a legal doctrine, remained mostly out public view until the September 11 attacks in 2001. In cases like Center for National Security Studies v. U.S. Department of Justice, Bush administration officials cited the mosaic theory before the D.C. Circuit court to argue for the blanket denial of FOIA requests in the interest of US national security. Mosaic theory, as it pertains to national defense, was further codified in "32 CFR §701.31 – Mosaic or compilation response," and President Bush expanded mosaic theory in the name of national security through an executive order. These changes all came alongside increased US government secrecy, as agencies took down, redacted, and hid public documentation. In this new environment, many courts, particularly the Third Circuit, either delegated or completely abdicated their responsibility for interpreting mosaic arguments.

In CIA black sites and the US military's interrogation centers at Guantanamo, Bagram Theater Internment Facility, and Kandahar detention facility, captives not suspected of involvement with terrorism were held and interrogated, and their imprisonment was justified with a mosaic argument. US analysts believed that interrogation of these individuals, en masse, would allow them to fill in the intelligence "mosaic" and learn about actual terrorists. In one case where the mosaic theory was used against intelligence agents, US officials called for recently returned Canadian Abdullah Khadr's extradition to the US to face charges related to terrorism in December 2005. Canada's Attorney General successfully advanced claims that details of Khadr's capture and imprisonment could not be made public without endangering US national security.

=== Fourth Amendment interpretation ===
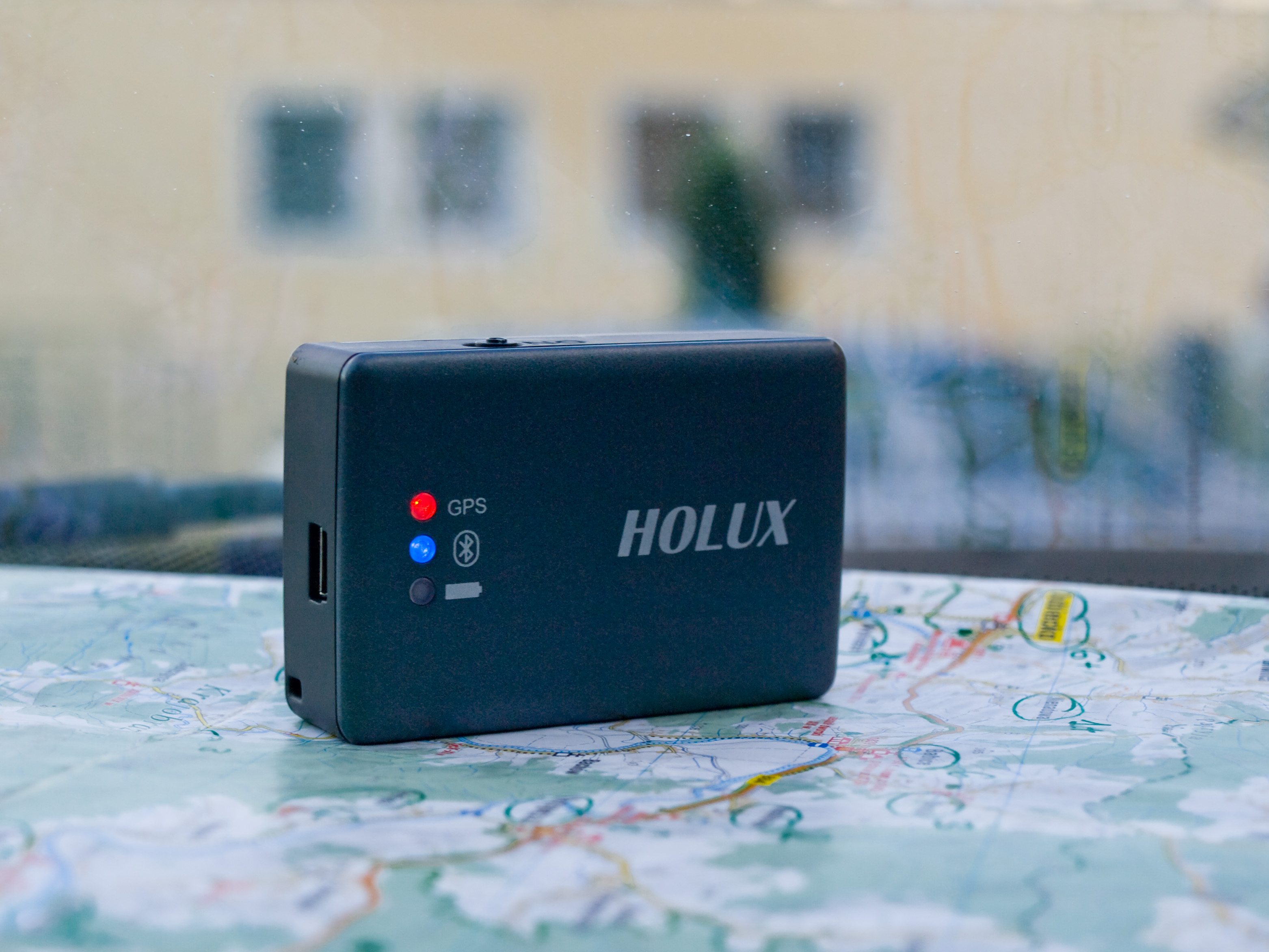
A GPS logger: its measurements can constitute a Fourth Amendment search according to the mosaic theory.

Mosaic theory further developed in response to the drastic expansion of police surveillance in public spaces, enabled by new technologies. This version of the theory asserts that the comprehensive collection of discrete data over time, if analyzed in the aggregate, exposes information about the lives, habits, and relationships of those surveilled that would have previously been impossible to gather and evaluate. As the US Supreme Court later articulated in Carpenter v. United States, the judiciary is "obligated, as subtler and more far-reaching means of invading privacy have become available to the government, to ensure that the progress of science does not erode Fourth Amendment protections."

The D.C. Circuit court was the first to apply mosaic theory to a Fourth Amendment issue in United States v. Maynard, a case involving GPS surveillance of a car over a period of twenty-eight days. To answer this question, the court applied the test developed by Justice Harlan in Katz v. United States. Under the Katz test, courts consider "whether the individual has an expectation of privacy that society is prepared to recognize as reasonable," with the reasonableness of the expectation of privacy dependent in large part on whether or not the information was "expose[d] to the public."

The court looked to mosaic theory in national security cases, used in that context to justify the withholding of information requested under the Freedom of Information Act on the grounds that aggregated data might allow an observer to piece together secret information like the identity of an intelligence source. The Maynard court assessed the four-week period of surveillance as a whole, noting that the surveillance "illustrate[d] how the sequence of a person’s movements may reveal more than the individual movements of which it is composed."

The D.C. Circuit ultimately held that the warrantless use of GPS surveillance over a 28-day period was an illegal search under the Fourth Amendment, in large part because the data captured by the GPS over that period had not been exposed to the public and because the respondent in Maynard had a reasonable expectation of privacy. The D.C. Circuit then reversed the conviction of one of the two respondents because the conviction rested on evidence that had been obtained through the unlawful search.

The Supreme Court of the United States upheld the D.C. Circuit’s reversal in United States v. Jones, which also dealt with extended GPS location surveillance of the defendant’s vehicle. While not making explicit reference to mosaic theory, Justice Alito’s concurring opinion, joined by three other justices, and Justice Sotomayor’s concurring opinion are both understood to offer strong defenses of the mosaic theory developed by the D.C. Circuit in Maynard. Justice Alito argued that courts should consider mosaic theory when applying the Katz test, looking to the length of time of the surveillance when deciding whether it constitutes a search under the Fourth Amendment, without setting an exact, appropriate time limit for warrantless surveillance. Justice Sotomayor offered a different formulation of mosaic theory, one in which courts should instead consider the quantity and quality of the data obtained through surveillance when determining whether it constitutes a search. Justice Sotomayor expressed concern over the constitutionality of the generation of a comprehensive and detailed record of a defendant’s public movements, regardless of whether that record was developed in the long or short term.

As a result of these cases, singular US law enforcement acts that are not "searches" in the traditional sense can be deemed a "search" when aggregated.

== Other cases ==
=== Riley v. California ===
Although mosaic theory was not identified by name in Riley v. California (2014), some argue that the theory underpinned the majority’s holding that warrantless searches of cell phones are not permitted under the Fourth Amendment. The majority cited Justice Sotomayor’s concurrence in Jones to support the idea that the information carried on a device like a cell phone is both quantitatively and qualitatively different from that which can be obtained through other searches. For Chief Justice Roberts, the author of the majority opinion, access to the aggregation of personal information found on a cell phone could allow the government to gain a revealing picture of a person’s life.

=== Carpenter v. United States ===
Some also argue that mosaic theory also underpinned the Court’s reasoning in Carpenter v. United States (2018). In Carpenter, the Court held that the acquisition of cell site location information (CSLI), information that could be used to determine the approximate location of a cell phone at a given time, from a wireless carrier was a search under the Fourth Amendment.

Ordinarily, the third-party doctrine would allow the government to obtain information that a person voluntarily turns over to an entity like a bank or telephone company. Such information, for example the deposit slips a customer provides to a bank, can be obtained directly from the third-party without constituting a search under the Fourth Amendment. Unlike other information obtained from third parties, in Carpenter v. United States, the CSLI was protected by the Fourth Amendment because it could be used to create a "detailed chronicle of a person’s physical presence" that "implicate[d] privacy concerns far beyond those considered" by the Court in other third-party cases. The Court’s focus on the depth, breadth, and comprehensive scope of the CSLI is seen as an endorsement of the mosaic theory.

=== Lower court cases ===
In the wake of Jones and Carpenter, lower courts have engaged with arguments rooted in mosaic theory. For example:

- In United States v. Kubasiak (2018), the U.S. District Court for the Eastern District of Wisconsin denied a defendant’s motion to suppress video footage from a surveillance camera that had been installed on an adjacent property by the Wisconsin Department of Justice for the purpose of monitoring the defendant’s home. The defendant invoked mosaic theory to argue that the surveillance was a search because it "allowed law enforcement . . . to monitor every single event that took place in his back yard for a long time." But the court rejected this argument in part because the camera, fixed in place to monitor the defendant’s backyard, "did not present the kind of aggregate view of intimate details of the defendant’s every movement that concerned the concurrence in Jones, or the majority in Carpenter."
- In United States v. Moore-Bush (2019), the U.S. District Court for the District of Massachusetts granted a defendant’s motion to suppress footage of the defendant’s home captured by a surveillance camera installed by law enforcement officers on a nearby utility pole. Determining that mosaic theory had effectively been adopted by the Supreme Court when it cited to Justice Alito and Justice Sotomayor’s concurring opinions in Carpenter, the court found that the government’s use of a surveillance camera constituted a search. For the court, the government’s ability to surveil the defendant’s home for an extended period of time, ability to manipulate the camera to zoom in on details such as the license plates of cars parked near the home, ability to capture footage of the defendant’s driveway and the front of her home, and the ability to compile the footage in a searchable log allowed the government to "piece together intimate details of [the defendant’s life]."
- In United States v. Shipton (2019), the U.S. District Court for the District of Minnesota denied the defendant’s motion to suppress evidence that had been obtained from his computer through police monitoring of peer-to-peer (P2P) file-sharing networks. The defendant cited Justice Alito and Justice Sotomayor’s concurrences in Jones to support his argument that the "sweeping scope" of the surveillance at issue gave "rise to a reasonable expectation of privacy." The court rejected this argument noting that while the police surveillance did implicate a vast quantity of information from a broad set of P2P network users, only a small portion of that information pertained to the defendant. Additionally, the information obtained through the surveillance, limited to "identifying information about files," was nowhere near as revealing as the CSLI at issue in Carpenter or the GPS tracking at issue in Jones.

== Criticism ==
=== National security ===
Legal scholar David Pozen, writing in 2005, argued that the lenient interpretation that courts have given to government mosaic arguments is an abdication of judicial judgement. As a result, "In over thirty years of the theory's existence, only one FOIA court on record has rejected a government agency's mosaic defense. In theory, highly speculative mosaic claims are unfalsifiable; in practice, they have proven unimpeachable."

Monica Eppinger noted, in intelligence gathering, mosaic theory arguments could allow an individual to be held and interrogated indefinitely, even if they were not a suspect:

With this "mosaic theory" of intelligence, where the goal of those conducting the inquiry and investigation is to amass enough small bits of information to piece together a broader picture of the threats ahead or the perpetrators behind, a detainee might not even be aware that he or she knows something useful, or know what to divulge were he or she inclined to facilitate the process. This departs from both the "grand criminal" (or war criminal) model and the high-value detainee model. Under the logic of this process, a "useful" detainee, i.e., one with information within the scope of relevance, may be held for questioning, even if not a criminal suspect, and, under a standard of a wide scope of relevance, the greater the number of detainees, the more sources of mosaic bits, and the more full the picture composed.

Eppinger pointed out the human rights violations this caused. If individuals being held for interrogation were actual suspects, they would receive due process—a right those held under the mosaic theory were denied.

=== Fourth Amendment ===
One criticism of mosaic theory is that it creates a significant "line drawing" problem: it is difficult to determine just how much data needs to be gathered before actions by law enforcement officers become a search. Another criticism is that mosaic theory is inconsistent with other Fourth Amendment doctrines under which data gathered through public observation or by receipt from third-parties is not the product of a search. Under current law observations made through the police’s visual surveillance would not implicate the Fourth Amendment, but the same data might if gathered by a GPS device. Others have argued that application of mosaic theory will "unjustifiably expand or contract the Fourth Amendment’s protections."

Proponents of mosaic theory argue that current Fourth Amendment doctrine used to assess whether or not government action constitutes a search "potentially undervalue[s] privacy rights." The "large-scale and long term aggregations of data" at issue in cases like Carpenter merit protection under the Fourth Amendment because they are fundamentally different from that which might be gathered in "single event" or "small-scale" acts of surveillance. Supporters also argue that new technologies employed by law enforcement officers alter the "balance between the State and its citizens" making it much easier for the government to collect large amounts of data, often in ways "so pervasive that no citizen can realistically be aware of what data about him is being collected."

== See also ==
- Fruit of the poisonous tree
- Kyllo v. United States
- Minimally invasive warrantless search
- Mosaic theory (investments)
- Sugar bowl (legal maxim)
- Third-party doctrine
