= United States v. Franklin =

21st-century court case involving AIPAC

United States v. Franklin, Rosen, and Weissman
- Court: United States District Court for the Eastern District of Virginia
- Citation: Not specified

Case history
- Subsequent actions: Franklin sentenced to community service and halfway house

Court membership
- Judge sitting: T. S. Ellis III

Case opinions
- Judge T. S. Ellis III delivered notable opinions regarding the Espionage Act

United States v. Franklin, Rosen, and Weissman was an early 21st century court case from the United States District Court for the Eastern District of Virginia. The government prosecuted one Department of Defense employee (Franklin) and two lobbyists (Rosen & Weissman) for the American Israel Public Affairs Committee (AIPAC) for allegedly disclosing national defense information to persons "not entitled" to have it, a crime under the Espionage Act of 1917 (18 U.S.C. § 793). It is one of the few Espionage Act cases of its kind, targeted not at traditional espionage or sedition, but at the practice of information leaking in Washington DC. The cases against Rosen and Weissman were also unusual because this aspect of the Espionage act had rarely (if ever) been used against non-government individuals. Franklin pleaded guilty, but all charges against Rosen and Weissman were dropped.

== Background ==
Larry Franklin worked for the Department of Defense at the Pentagon. Steve J. Rosen and Keith Weissman were lobbyists for the American Israel Public Affairs Committee, a lobbyist group. Rosen had worked at RAND Corporation and began work for AIPAC in 1982. Weissman started AIPAC work in 1993 and was an Iran expert. Franklin met Rosen and Weissman circa 2002 and they began exchanging information.

By 2003 the FBI had been investigating Rosen for a long time. The government flipped Franklin some time before 2003; he became convinced by the FBI that Rosen and Weissman were doing bad things. Franklin started wearing wires to get evidence against Weissman and Rosen, including a 2003 meeting where he leaked fake information about a planned killing of Israelis, which Rosen took and gave to Israeli diplomats and the media. In 2004 the government raided AIPAC offices. The government alleged the information the three transferred was related to the national defense and otherwise violated 18 U.S.C. § 793.

Larry Franklin counsel: Plato Cacheris, John Francis Hundley

Rosen counsel: Erica Emily Paulson, Joseph John McCarthy

Weissman counsel: John N Nassikas, III, Baruch Weiss

== Legal principles ==
Several legal principles were expounded upon regarding the relevant sections of the Espionage Act. Judge T. S. Ellis III had several notable opinions:

- Espionage cases against government employees are different from those against non-government individuals. Non-government individual's First Amendment rights can outweigh other concerns
- Espionage prosecutions can only be made in "situations in which the national security is genuinely at risk".
- The disclosure of intangible information is different from disclosing documents Intangible cases require "bad faith, i.e. with reason to believe the disclosure could harm the United States or aid a foreign government." (i.e. intent is important)
- There are limits to the government's attempts to conceal classified information at trial.
- "Noble motives don't erase the violation" - the belief that an official is exposing government wrongdoing is not justification - it does not make them innocent under Espionage Law. It is rather a violation of the principle that officials should follow the rule of law.
- The information disclosed has to be National Defense Information; being classified is not enough, in and of itself, for a violation. The judiciary (the jury) is to decide what is NDI and what is not.

Other notable features:

- The "silent witness rule" was used, to present evidence to the judge, jury, prosecutor, and defendant, while hiding it from the public. This was referred to by Ellis as a "partial closing" of the trial. He developed a "four part fairness test" for use of the rule during this case.
- It was one of the first (if not the first) Espionage Act cases that involved non-government officials getting information from a government official.

== Result ==
- Larry Franklin pleaded guilty in 2005 and received a 12 year sentence, later reduced to 100 hours community service and 10 months in a halfway house. This left only Counts I and III against Rosen and Weissman.
- All charges against Rosen and Weissman were dropped in 2009. The government claims the judge had made it unlikely they would win and also that they did not want to reveal classified information at trial.

== See also ==
- Classified Information Procedures Act (dealing with classified info in open court)
- Silent witness rule (used successfully for the first time at this trial)
- Classified information (law & history)
- Executive Order 13292 (regarding classified information)
- Official Secrets Act (UK law)
- Lawrence Franklin espionage scandal (page on the scandal)
- Espionage Act of 1917 (espionage law)
  - Thomas Andrews Drake, Stephen Jin-Woo Kim, Jeffrey Alexander Sterling (modern non-spy espionage act cases)
