= State secrets privilege =

Evidentiary rule in the US

The state secrets privilege is an evidentiary rule created by United States legal precedent. Application of the privilege results in exclusion of evidence from a legal case based solely on affidavits submitted by the government stating that court proceedings might disclose sensitive information which might endanger national security. United States v. Reynolds, which involved alleged military secrets, was the first case that saw formal recognition of the privilege.

Following a claim of "state secrets privilege", the court rarely conducts an in camera examination of the evidence to evaluate whether there is sufficient cause to support the use of this doctrine. This results in court rulings in which even the judge has not verified the veracity of the assertion. The privileged material is completely removed from the litigation, and the court must determine how the unavailability of the privileged information affects the case.

== Function ==
The purpose of the state secrets privilege is to prevent courts from revealing state secrets in the course of civil litigation. The government may intervene in any civil suit, including when it is not a party to the litigation, to ask the court to exclude state secrets evidence. While the courts may examine such evidence closely, in practice they generally defer to the Executive Branch. Once the court has agreed that evidence is subject to the state secrets privilege, it is excluded from the litigation. Often, as a practical matter, the plaintiff cannot continue the suit without the privileged information, and drops the case.

=== Distinguished from other legal doctrines ===
The state secrets privilege is related to, but distinct from, several other legal doctrines: the principle of non-justiciability in certain cases involving state secrets (the so-called "Totten Rule"); certain prohibitions on the publication of classified information (as in New York Times Co. v. United States, the Pentagon Papers case); and the use of classified information in criminal cases (governed by the Classified Information Procedures Act).

== History ==
=== Origins ===
The doctrine was effectively imported from English common law which has the similar public-interest immunity. It is debatable whether the state secrets privilege is based upon the President's powers as commander-in-chief and leader of foreign policy (as suggested in United States v. Nixon) or derived from the idea of separation of powers (as suggested in United States v. Reynolds). It seems that the US privilege "has its initial roots in Aaron Burr's trial for treason". In this case, it was alleged that a letter from General James Wilkinson to President Thomas Jefferson might contain state secrets and could therefore not be divulged without risk to national security.

=== Supreme Court recognition in United States v. Reynolds ===
The privilege was first officially recognized by the Supreme Court of the United States in United States v. Reynolds, 345 U.S. 1 (1953). A military airplane crashed. The widows of three civilian crew members sought accident reports on the crash but were told that to release such details would threaten national security by revealing the bomber's top-secret mission. The court held that only the government can claim or waive the privilege, but that it “is not to be lightly invoked” and that there “must be a formal claim of privilege, lodged by the head of the department which has control over the matter, after actual personal consideration by that officer.” The court stressed that the decision to withhold evidence is to be made by the presiding judge and not the executive.

In 2000, the accident reports were declassified and released, and it was found that the assertion that they contained secret information was untrue.

=== Recent use ===
According to former White House Counsel, John Dean:

While precise numbers are hard to come by (because not all cases are reported), a recent study reports that the "Bush administration has invoked the state secrets privilege in 23 cases since 2001." By way of comparison, "between 1953 and 1976, the government invoked the privilege in only four cases."

These figures were later retracted, as they were based on erroneous information:

Correction: In this article, we incorrectly reported that the government invoked the state secrets privilege in 23 cases since 2001. The figure came from the 2005 Secrecy Report Card published by OpenTheGovernment.org. The privilege was actually invoked seven times from 2001 to 2005, according to the corrected 2005 report card, which is not an increase from previous decades.

Following the September 11, 2001 attacks, the privilege is increasingly used to dismiss entire court cases, instead of only withholding the sensitive information from a case. Also in 2001, George W. Bush issued Executive Order 13233 extending the accessibility of the state secrets privilege to also allow former presidents, their designated representatives, or representatives designated by their families, to invoke it to bar records from their tenure. An article in the New York Times in August 2007, regarding a lawsuit involving Society for Worldwide Interbank Financial Telecommunication, concluded that judges were more willing to ask the government to validate its claims.

US Justice Department officials told a federal judge on 24 March 2025 that the Trump administration was invoking the state secrets privilege to avoid giving him information about deportation flights from earlier this month that are at the center of a legal dispute over whether the government flouted his judicial commands.

== Criticism ==
Since 2001, there has been mounting criticism of the state secrets privilege. Such criticism generally falls into four categories:

=== Weak external validation of executive assertion of privilege ===
Many commentators have expressed concern that the courts never effectively scrutinize executive claims of privilege. Lacking independent national security expertise, judges frequently defer to the judgment of the executive and never subject executive claims to meaningful scrutiny.

=== Executive abuse of the privilege to conceal embarrassing facts ===
Commentators have suggested that the state secrets privilege might be used to prevent disclosure of embarrassing facts as often as it is invoked to protect legitimate secrets. In the words of Professors William G. Weaver and Robert M. Pallitto in a Political Science Quarterly article:

[T]he incentive on the part of administrators is to use the privilege to avoid embarrassment, handicap political enemies, and to prevent criminal investigation of administrative action.

In several prominent cases, the evidence that the government successfully excluded was later revealed to contain no state secrets: United States v. Reynolds, Sterling v. Tenet, Edmonds v. Department of Justice, and the Pentagon Papers.

=== Expansion into a justiciability doctrine ===
Some academics and practitioners have criticized the expansion of the state secrets privilege from an evidentiary privilege (designed to exclude certain pieces of evidence) to a justiciability doctrine (designed to exclude entire lawsuits). Under its original formulation, the state secrets privilege was meant only to exclude a very narrow class of evidence whose revelation would harm national security. However, in a large percentage of recent cases, courts have gone a step further, dismissing entire cases in which the government asserts the privilege, in essence converting an evidentiary rule into a justiciability rule. The government response has been that in certain cases, the subject of the case is itself privileged. In these cases, the government argues, there is no plausible way to respond to a complaint without revealing state secrets.

=== Elimination of judicial check on executive power ===
Glenn Greenwald alleges that the Bush administration attempted to expand executive power, as evidenced by the unitary executive theory propagated by John Yoo. The theory suggests that the President, as Commander-in-Chief, cannot be bound by Congress or any law, national or international. By invoking the state secrets privilege in cases involving actions taken in the war on terror (e.g. extraordinary rendition, cases of torture, NSA warrantless surveillance), Greenwald opines the administration tried to evade judicial review of these claims of exceptional war powers. In effect, this is preventing a judicial ruling determining whether there is a legal basis for such expansive executive power.

== Calls for reform ==
In recent years, a number of commentators have called for legislative reforms to the state secrets privilege. These reforms center around several ideas:

1. Requiring judges to review each piece of evidence that the executive claims is subject to the privilege.
2. Requiring the executive to craft alternative evidence that is not subject to the privilege, for the opposing party to use in place of the original, privileged evidence. Such substitute evidence should only be required when it is possible to do so without harming national security.
3. Prohibiting courts from dismissing claims on the basis of the state secrets privilege until after they have reviewed all available evidence.
4. Permitting the court to appoint an outside expert to scrutinize the evidence for national security content.
5. Excluding illegal government action from the definition of "state secrets," or otherwise allowing the court to address the legality (instead of just the secrecy) of government conduct. This would prevent the government from using the state secrets privilege to conceal its illegal conduct.

On January 22, 2008, Senators Edward Kennedy, Patrick Leahy and Arlen Specter introduced S. 2533, the State Secrets Protection Act.

== Court cases ==
=== United States v. Reynolds ===
In United States v. Reynolds (1953), the widows of three crew members of a B-29 Superfortress bomber that had crashed in 1948 sought accident reports on the crash, but were told the release of such details would threaten national security by revealing the nature of the bomber's top-secret mission. The Supreme Court ruled that the executive branch could bar evidence from the court if it deemed that its release would impair national security. In 1996, the accident reports in question were declassified and released, and when discovered in 2000 were found to contain no secret information. They did, however, contain information about the poor condition of the aircraft itself, which would have been very compromising to the Air Force's case. Many legal experts have alleged government abuse of secrecy in this landmark case.

=== Richard Horn ===
Former DEA agent Richard Horn brought a suit against the CIA for bugging his home. The case was dismissed because of the privilege.

Richard Horn's case was reinstated on July 20, 2009, by U.S. District Court Judge Royce C. Lamberth on the basis that the CIA had engaged in fraud on the court.

On March 30, 2010, as a result of a multimillion-dollar settlement agreement between Horn and the government, Lamberth dismissed the underlying case with prejudice. Subsequently, later that same year, in a September 22 order, Lamberth issued a final order vacating his earlier opinions and orders finding that Arthur Brown, the former CIA station chief in Burma, and George Tenet had committed fraud on the court. Lamberth also specifically ordered that a sentence be removed from his March 30, 2010 Memorandum. The removed sentence had stated that "allegations of wrongdoing by the government attorneys in this case are not only credible, they are admitted".

=== Notra Trulock ===
In February 2002, it was invoked in the case of Notra Trulock, who launched a defamation suit against Los Alamos scientist Wen Ho Lee, falsely charged with stealing nuclear secrets; President Bush stated that national security would be compromised if Trulock were allowed to seek damages from Lee; though it resulted in the case being dismissed, another suit was launched directly attacking then-FBI Director Louis Freeh for interfering and falsely invoking the state secrets privilege.

=== Sibel Edmonds ===
The privilege was invoked twice against Sibel Edmonds. The first invocation was to prevent her from testifying that the Federal Government had foreknowledge that Al-Qaeda intended to use airliners to attack the United States on September 11, 2001; the case was a $100 trillion action filed in 2002 by six hundred 9/11 victims' families against officials of the Saudi government and prominent Saudi citizens. The second invocation was in an attempt to derail her personal lawsuit regarding her dismissal from the FBI, where she had worked as a post-9/11 translator and had been a whistleblower.

=== Thomas Burnett ===
The privilege was invoked in Thomas Burnett vs. Al Barka Investment & Development Corporation (Civil No. 04ms203) a motion to quash a subpoena for the testimony of Sibel Edmonds. The government's motion to quash based on state secrets privilege was granted in part.

=== Sterling v. Tenet ===
Jeffrey Sterling was an African-American CIA agent who started a racial discrimination suit. It was thrown out on account of this privilege.

=== Nira Schwartz ===
The privilege was invoked in Schwartz vs. TRW (Civil No. 96-3065, Central District, California) a qui tam claim by Schwartz. Intervention and assertion of the state secrets privilege, by the government, resulted in case dismissal.

=== Crater Corporation ===
The privilege was invoked in the United States Court of Appeals for the Federal Circuit case of Crater Corporation vs. Lucent Technologies Inc. and AT&T Company, in September 2005. Crater was prevented from proceeding with discovery in its patent infringement case (U.S. Patent No. 5,286,129) by the United States' assertion that discovery could cause "extremely grave damage to national security". The infringement case centered on wet-mate underwater fiber optic coupling devices beneath the sea.

=== ACLU vs. NSA ===
On May 26, 2006, the U.S. Justice Department filed a motion to dismiss ACLU v. NSA, the ACLU's lawsuit against the NSA by invoking the state secrets privilege. On July 26, 2006, the case was dismissed. In a different case in Michigan, brought by the ACLU against the NSA on behalf of various scholars, journalists, attorneys, and national non-profit organizations, Judge Anna Diggs Taylor ruled on August 17, 2006, that the program was unconstitutional and should be halted. She upheld the doctrine but ruled that the government's public statements concerning the operation were admissible and constituted sufficient proof for the case to continue without any privileged evidence or discovery. On July 6, 2007, the Sixth Circuit Court of Appeals threw out Taylor's decision, ruling 2-1 that the ACLU could not produce evidence to prove that the ACLU had been wrongfully wiretapped by the NSA and therefore did not have the standing to bring such a case to court, regardless of the legality question. On February 19, 2008, the Supreme Court declined to hear the ACLU's appeal.

=== Center for Constitutional Rights et al. v. Bush et al. ===
On May 27, 2006, the Justice Department moved to preempt the Center for Constitutional Rights (CCR) challenge to warrantless domestic surveillance by invoking the state secrets privilege. The Bush administration argued that CCR's case could reveal secrets regarding U.S. national security, and thus the presiding judge must dismiss it without reviewing the evidence.

=== Hepting v. AT&T ===
In April 2006, the Bush administration took initial steps to use the state secrets rule to block a lawsuit against AT&T and the National Security Agency brought by the Electronic Frontier Foundation. The EFF alleged that the government had secret computer rooms conducting broad, illegal surveillance of American citizens. Testifying at a January 29, 2008, House Judiciary Committee hearing on reform of the state secrets privilege, EFF attorney Kevin Bankston contended that the administration's interpretation of the privilege was overly broad, and failed to properly consider the evidentiary procedures provided for by Section 1806(f) of the Foreign Intelligence Surveillance Act. However, the case was dismissed on June 3, 2009, citing legislation (section 802 of the Foreign Intelligence Surveillance Act) stating that

in the case of a covered civil action, the assistance alleged to have been provided by the electronic communication service provider was in connection with an intelligence activity involving communications that was authorized by the President during the period beginning on September 11, 2001, and ending on January 17, 2007; designed to detect or prevent a terrorist attack, or activities in preparation for a terrorist attack, against the United States; and the subject of a written request or directive, or a series of written requests or directives, from the Attorney General or the head of an element of the intelligence community (or the deputy of such person) to the electronic communication service provider indicating that the activity was authorized by the President; and determined to be lawful.

=== Khalid El-Masri ===
In May 2006, the illegal detention case of Khalid El-Masri was dismissed based on the privilege, which was invoked by the Central Intelligence Agency (CIA). Khalid El-Masri alleged that he was falsely held by the CIA for several months (which the CIA acknowledges) and was beaten, drugged, and subjected to torture, degrading and inhuman treatment while in United States captivity. He was ultimately released by the CIA with no charge ever being brought against him by the United States government. Judge T. S. Ellis III of the U.S. District Court dismissed the case because, according to the court, the simple fact of holding proceedings would jeopardize state secrets, as claimed by the CIA. On March 2, 2007, the United States Court of Appeals for the Fourth Circuit affirmed. On October 9, 2007, the Supreme Court declined to hear an appeal of the Fourth Circuit's decision, letting the doctrine of state secrets privilege stand.

=== Maher Arar ===
The privilege was invoked against a case where Maher Arar, a wrongfully-accused and tortured victim, sought to sue Attorney General John Ashcroft for his role in deporting Arar to Syria to face torture and extract false confessions. It was formally invoked by Deputy Attorney General James B. Comey in legal papers filed in the United States District Court for the Eastern District of New York. The invocation read, "Litigating [the] plaintiff's complaint would necessitate disclosure of classified information", which it later stated included disclosure of the basis for detaining him in the first place, the basis for refusing to deport him to Canada as he had requested, and the basis for sending him to Syria.

=== Jane Doe et al. v. CIA ===
On January 4, 2007, District Court Judge Laura Taylor Swain ordered the dismissal of Jane Doe et al. v. CIA, 05 Civ. 7939 based on the state secrets privilege, as it would endanger the "weapons systems [..] of our nation's warships". Jane Doe and her children sued the CIA after her husband's covert employment with the CIA was "terminated immediately for unspecified reasons" and they were forced to leave USA for a country where the plaintiff remains a "virtual prisoner in her home".

=== Enterprises Shipping & Trading v. United Against Nuclear Iran ===
In July 2013, Greek shipping magnate Victor Restis brought a defamation lawsuit against UANI for claiming that his companies were "front men for the illicit activities of the Iranian regime." In March 2015, the case of the Obama administration and Department of Justice stated that details about United Against Nuclear Iran are subject to U.S. state secrets privilege, and would do "harm to national security if the information were disclosed."

=== General Dynamics Corp. v. United States ===
In the 2011 General Dynamics case, the court unanimously held that "when litigation would end up disclosing state secrets, courts may not try the claims and may not award relief to either party."

=== Federal Bureau of Investigation v. Fazaga ===
During 2006 to 2007, the FBI had an informant Craig Monteilh to integrate into the Muslim Islamic Center of Irvine in Irvine, California and plant electronic surveillance within the mosque and members' homes and offices. Monteilh's role was terminated by the FBI after they lost confidence with him, and he ended up in prison on separate drug charges, where he was stabbed repeatedly for being a snitch. He filed suit against the FBI for failing to protect him, revealing extensive details of his informant role. Members of the Islamic Center of Irvine filed suit against the FBI for numerous charges related to violation of their rights in 2011, but the FBI asserted that the case should be dropped by evoking their state secrets privilege, as litigation would be a threat to national security. The district court ruled for the FBI, but the Ninth Circuit reversed in part, stating that under the Foreign Intelligence Surveillance Act Section 1806(f), the plaintiffs' right to seek legal action overrode the FBI's privilege. The FBI petitioned to the Supreme Court, which, in March 2022, ruled unanimously that the FISA does not displace the state secrets privilege, overturning the Ninth Circuit's ruling.

=== United States v. Zubaydah ===
The state secrets privilege was invoked in an ex parte discovery application by Guantánamo detainee Abu Zubaydah seeking testimony from James Elmer Mitchell and John Jessen, two former CIA contractors involved in the CIA torture program. Zubaydah sought to submit the testimonies as evidence in a criminal investigation in Poland into torture he suffered in that country at a CIA black site. However, the CIA objected, claiming that any information about the black site was classified and couldn't be disclosed. On February 21, 2018, Judge Justin L. Quackenbush dismissed the lawsuit, upholding the privilege. While finding that "The Government’s argument that merely confirming a detention site was operated in Poland would pose a grave risk to national security is not convincing" because "The fact of such operation has been widely reported, has been acknowledged by the individual who was President of Poland at the time the site allegedly operated, and has been found by proof beyond a reasonable doubt by the European Court of Human Rights", he nevertheless concluded that "compelling Mitchell and Jessen to answer as to the mere fact of whether operations were conducted in Poland would not seem of much, if any, assistance to a Polish investigation. Rather, counsel for Petitioners said it would be useful if Mitchell and Jessen could identify if there were foreign (Polish) officials at the detention site, and the nature of their roles at the site". However, the United States Court of Appeals for the Ninth Circuit found that "the district court erred in quashing the subpoenas in toto rather than attempting to disentangle nonprivileged from privileged information", ruling that "To be a 'state secret,' a fact must first be a 'secret'". Despite a dissenting opinion from 12 judges, the Ninth Circuit declined to rehear the case en banc.

On March 3, 2022, the Supreme Court reversed the Ninth Circuit in a mostly 7–2 vote. Justice Stephen Breyer, joined in full by Chief Justice John Roberts and in part by Justices Brett Kavanaugh and Amy Coney Barrett, argued that even if information about the CIA black site in Poland had been publicly disclosed, the type of information sought by Zubaydah "would tend to confirm (or deny) the existence of a CIA detention site in Poland" and that there were reasonable grounds for the government to consider any further confirmation a matter of national security, as it could potentially reveal the existence of black sites in other countries.

Justice Clarence Thomas wrote a concurring opinion, joined by Justice Samuel Alito. Thomas said the lawsuit should be dismissed because Zubaydah had not shown that he actually needed the information he sought, and therefore there was no need for the court to decide whether the information was protected by state secrets. Justice Elena Kagan also wrote a concurring opinion, saying the case should be sent back to the lower court to consider whether some of the informations Zubaydah sought could be separated from state secrets.

Justice Neil Gorsuch wrote the dissenting opinion, joined by Sonia Sotomayor. Gorsuch argued that the fact that Zubaydah was held at a black site in Poland between 2002 and 2003 was now public knowledge and could therefore no longer be a state secret, and expressed concern about the government's overclassification of information. He also concluded, agreeing with Kagan, that the case should be remanded to District Court to determine what information could be obtained without evoking state secrets.

== Case citations ==
- Totten v. United States, 92 U.S. 105 (1876)
- United States v. Reynolds, 345 U.S. 1 (1953)
- Tenet v. Doe, 544 U.S. 1 (2005)
- General Dynamics Corp. v. United States, 563 U.S. 478 (2011)
- United States v. Zubaydah, No. 20-827, 595 U.S. ___ (2022)
- Federal Bureau of Investigation v. Fazaga, No. 20-828, 595 U.S. ___ (2022)

== Quotes ==
- "The state secrets privilege is a common law evidentiary rule that allows the government to withhold information from discovery when disclosure would be inimical to national security." – Zuckerbraun v. General Dynamics Corp., 935 F.2d 544, 546 (2d Cir. 1991).

== See also ==
- Espionage Act of 1917
- Mosaic theory of intelligence gathering
- Unitary executive theory
- Federal Tort Claims Act
- Classified Information Procedures Act
- State Secrets Protection Act
- Silent witness rule
