= McDonnell Douglas A-12 Avenger II =

Proposed carrier-based strike aircraft

A-12 Avenger II
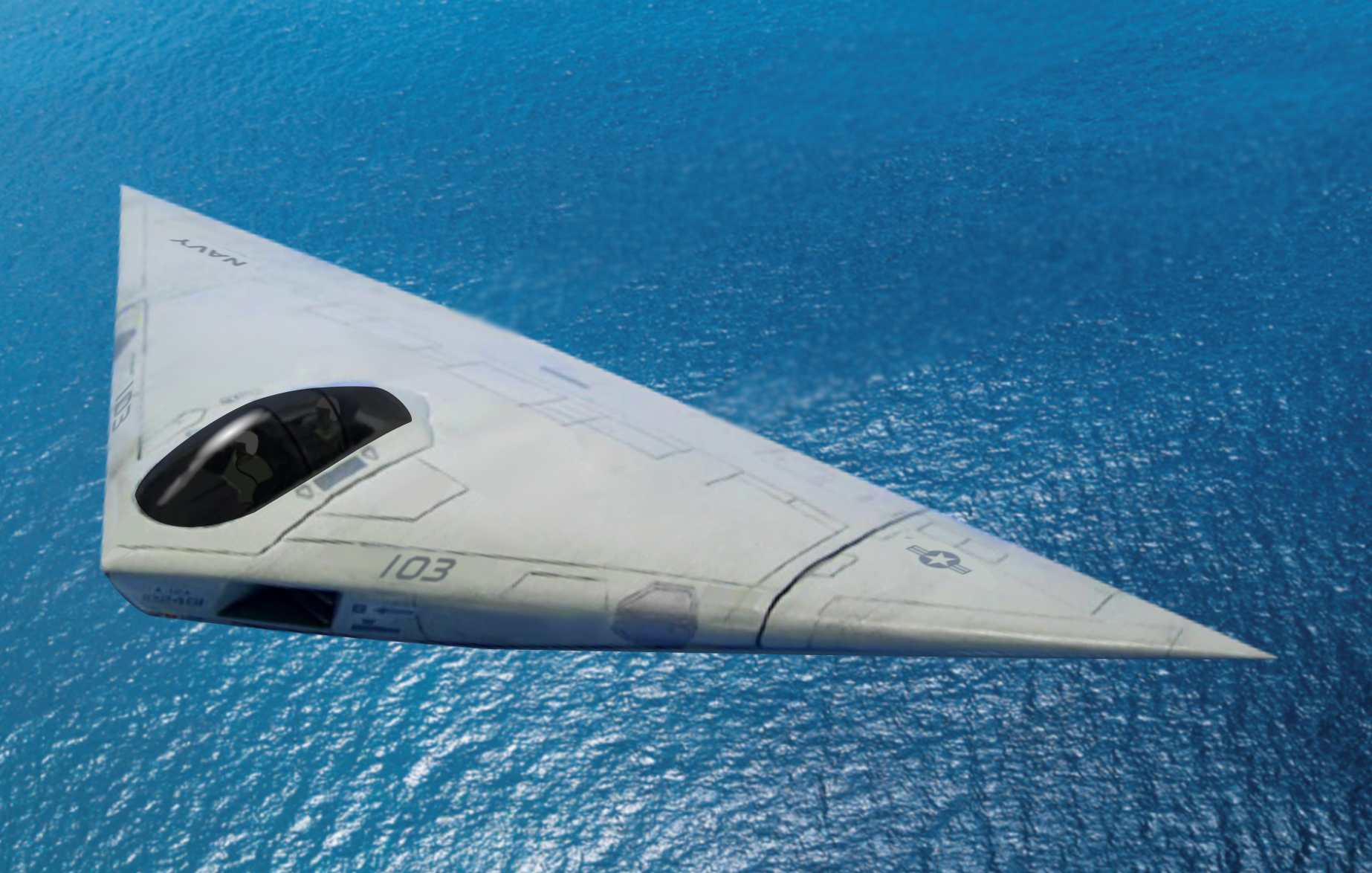
- Artist's impression of the A-12 in flight

General information
- Type: All-weather naval stealth bomber
- Manufacturer: McDonnell Douglas and General Dynamics
- Status: Canceled
- Primary users: United States Navy United States Marine Corps
- Number built: 0; mockup only

The General Dynamics/McDonnell Douglas A-12 Avenger II was a proposed American attack aircraft from General Dynamics and McDonnell Douglas. It was to be an all-weather, carrier-based stealth bomber replacement for the Grumman A-6 Intruder in the United States Navy and Marine Corps. Its Avenger II name was taken from the Grumman TBF Avenger of World War II.

The development of the A-12 was troubled by cost overruns and several delays, causing questions of the program's ability to deliver upon its objectives; these doubts led to the development program's cancellation in 1991. The manner of its cancellation was contested through litigation until a settlement was reached in January 2014.

== Design and development ==
=== Advanced Tactical Aircraft program ===
The United States Navy began the Advanced Tactical Aircraft (ATA) program in 1983. The program was to develop and field a replacement for the A-6 Intruder by 1994. Stealth technology developed for the United States Air Force would be used heavily in the program. Concept design contracts were awarded to the industry teams of McDonnell Douglas/General Dynamics, and Northrop/Grumman/Vought in November 1984. The teams were awarded contracts for further concept development in 1986.

The General Dynamics/McDonnell Douglas team was selected as the winner on 13 January 1988; the rival team led by Grumman surprisingly failed to submit a final bid. The General Dynamics/McDonnell Douglas team was awarded a development contract and the ATA aircraft was designated A-12. The first flight was initially planned for December 1990. The A-12 was named Avenger II in homage to the World War II-era Navy torpedo-bomber Grumman TBF Avenger.

The Navy initially sought to buy 620 A-12s and Marines wanted 238. In addition, the Air Force briefly considered ordering some 400 of an A-12 derivative. The A-12 was promoted as a possible replacement for the Air Force's General Dynamics F-111 Aardvark, and for the United Kingdom's Panavia Tornado fighter-bombers. The craft was a flying wing design in the shape of an isosceles triangle, with the cockpit situated near the apex of the triangle. The A-12 gained the nickname "Flying Dorito".

The aircraft was to be powered by two General Electric F412-D5F2 turbofan engines, each producing about 13,000 pounds-force (58 kN) of thrust. It was designed to carry out precision guided weapons internally, up to two AIM-120 AMRAAM air-to-air missiles, two AGM-88 HARM air-to-ground missiles and a complement of air-to-ground ordnance, including unguided or precision-guided bombs, could be carried in an internal weapons bay. It has been claimed that the A-12 was to be capable of delivering nuclear weapons held in its internal weapons bay as well. The A-12 was to have a weapons load of 5,160 pounds (2,300 kg).

Beginning in early 1990 General Dynamics and McDonnell Douglas revealed delays and projected cost increases. Due to late requirement changes to the aircraft impacting the composite design, aircraft weight had increased to 30% over design specification. This was unwelcome for an airplane that needed to operate efficiently and effectively from an aircraft carrier. Technical difficulties with the complexity of the radar system to be used also caused costs to increase; by one estimate the A-12 was to consume up to 70% of the Navy's budget for aircraft. After delays, its critical design review was successfully completed in October 1990 and the maiden flight was rescheduled to early 1992. In December 1990 plans were made for 14 Navy aircraft carriers to be equipped with a wing of 20 A-12s each.

A government report released in November 1990 documented serious problems with the A-12 development program. In December 1990 Secretary of Defense Dick Cheney told the Navy to justify the program and deliver reasons why it should not be canceled. The response given by the Navy and the contractors failed to persuade the Secretary of Defense, as he canceled the program in the following month, on 7 January 1991, for breach of contract.

The A-12 I did terminate. It was not an easy decision to make because it's an important requirement that we're trying to fulfill. But no one could tell me how much the program was going to cost, even just through the full scale development phase, or when it would be available. And data that had been presented at one point a few months ago turned out to be invalid and inaccurate.

— Secretary of Defense Dick Cheney, 1991.

The government felt the contractors could not complete the program and instructed them to repay most of the $2 billion that had been spent on A-12 development. McDonnell Douglas and General Dynamics disputed this in Federal Claims court. The reasons and causes for the cancellation have been debated and have been an issue of controversy.

=== Aftermath ===
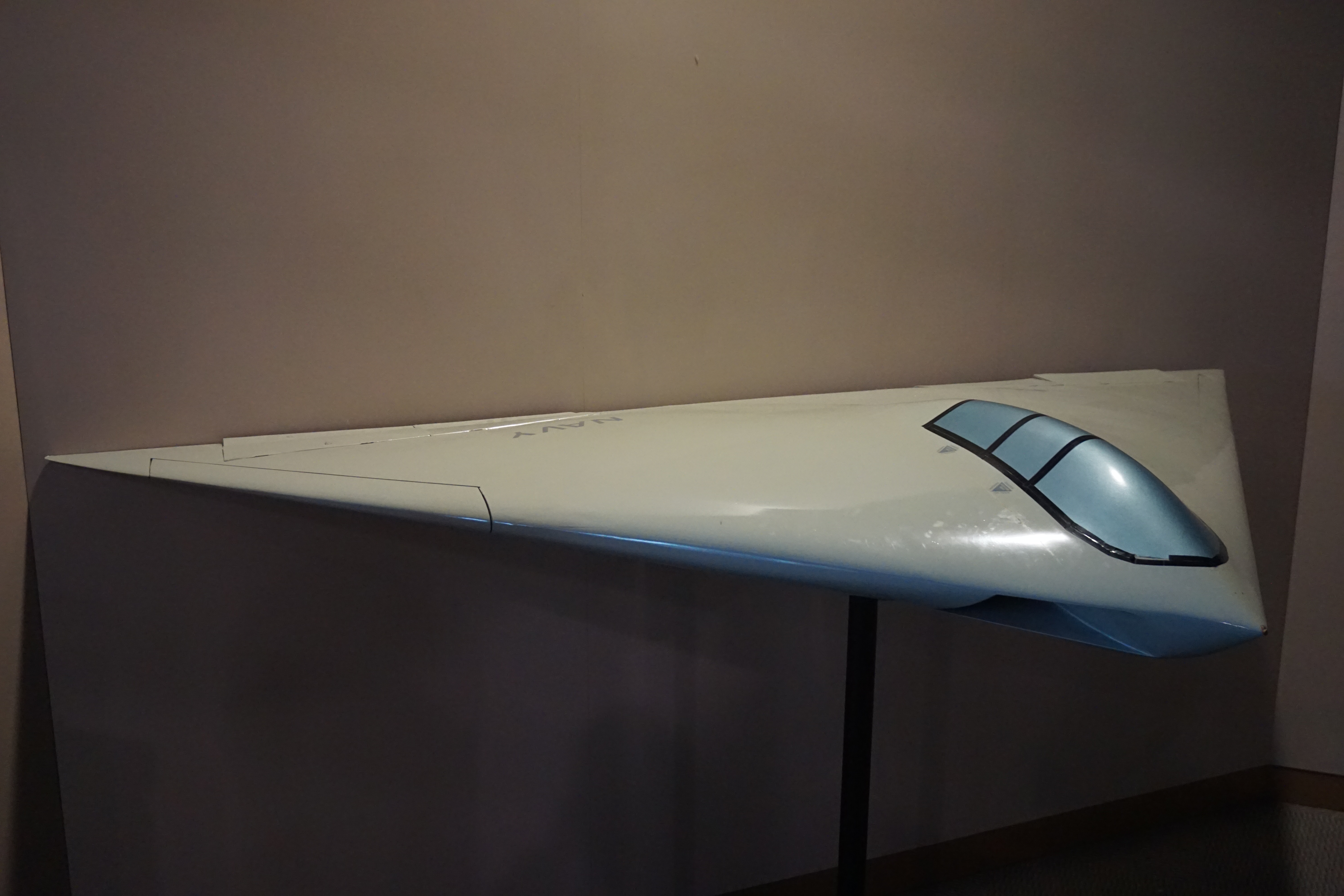
An A-12 Avenger II model on display at the Frontiers of Flight Museum

After the cancellation of the A-12, the Navy initiated a new attack aircraft program, the Advanced Attack (A-X), to replace the A-6 Intruder; A-X would shortly become the Advanced Attack/Fighter (A/F-X) due to added fighter capabilities to eventually replace the F-14 Tomcat as well. Meanwhile, the Navy also elected to purchase the F/A-18E/F Super Hornet as an interim for A/F-X, and the Super Hornet uses the General Electric F414 turbofan engine, which is a modified variant of the upgraded F404 version developed for the A-12. A/F-X would be canceled in the 1993 Bottom Up Review, leaving the Super Hornet as the mainstay of the Navy's tactical air power. The full-size A-12 mockup was revealed to the public at the Naval Air Station Joint Reserve Base Fort Worth in June 1996. The cancellation of the A-12 is seen as one of the major losses in the 1990s that weakened McDonnell Douglas and led to its merger with rival Boeing in 1997. After years of being in storage at the Lockheed Martin Aeronautics (formerly General Dynamics) facility in Fort Worth, Texas, the mockup was transported to Veterans Memorial Air Park (later renamed Fort Worth Aviation Museum) adjacent to Meacham Airport in north Fort Worth in June 2013.

The manner in which the program was canceled led to years of litigation between the contractors and the Department of Defense over breach of contract (General Dynamics Corp. v. United States). On 1 June 2009, the U.S. Court of Appeals for the Federal Circuit ruled that the U.S. Navy was justified in canceling the contract. The ruling also required the two contractors to repay the U.S. government US$1.35 billion, plus interest charges of US$1.45 billion. Boeing, which had merged with McDonnell Douglas, and General Dynamics vowed to appeal the ruling. In September 2010, the U.S. Supreme Court said it would hear the two companies' arguments, that the government canceled the project improperly and that the use of the state secrets privilege by the U.S. prevented them from mounting an effective defense. In May 2011, the Supreme Court set aside the Appeals Court decision and returned the case to federal circuit court. In January 2014, the case was settled with Boeing and General Dynamics agreeing to pay $200 million each to the U.S. Navy.

== Specifications (A-12 Avenger II) ==
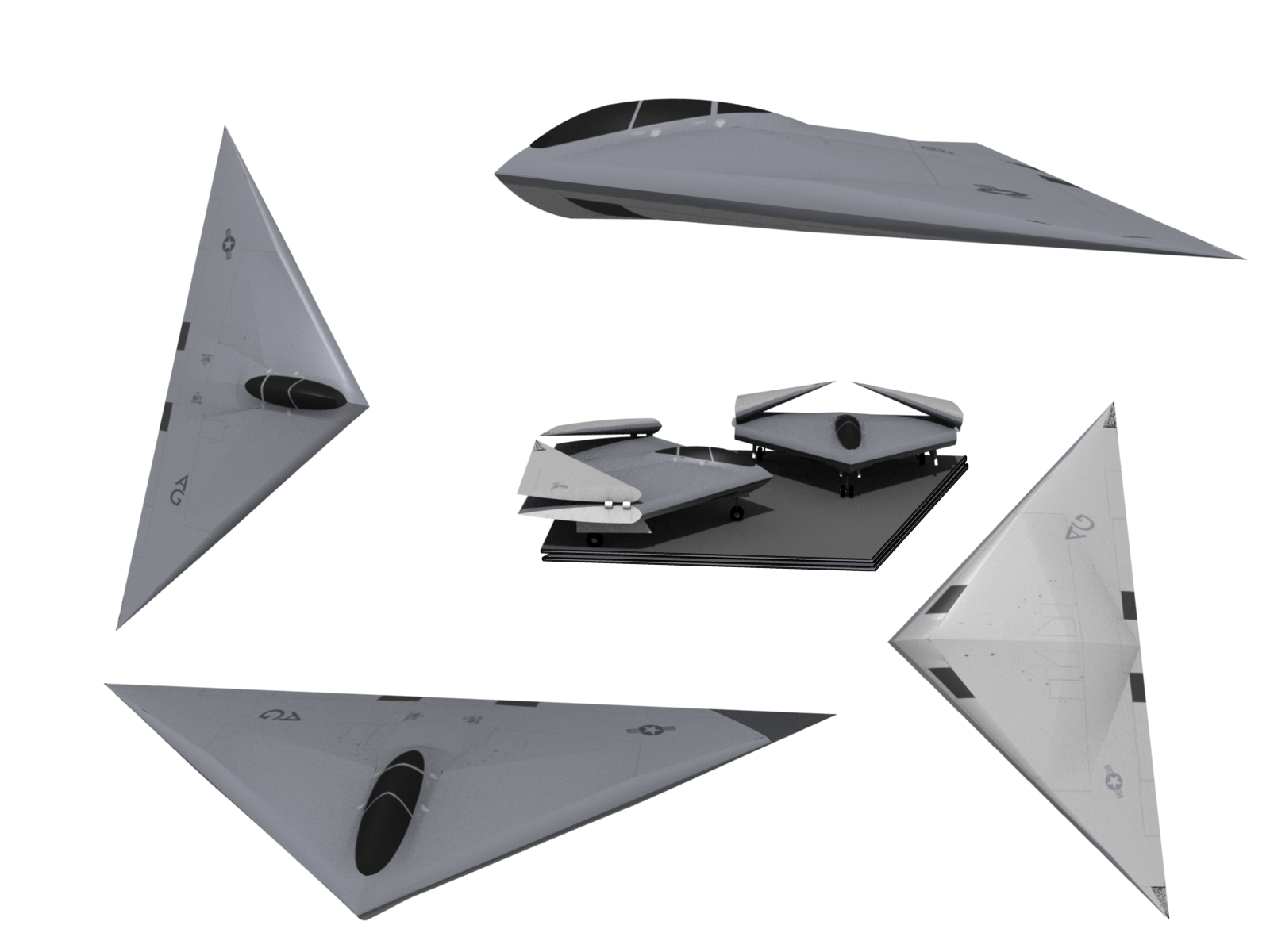
Various views of the A-12 as designed

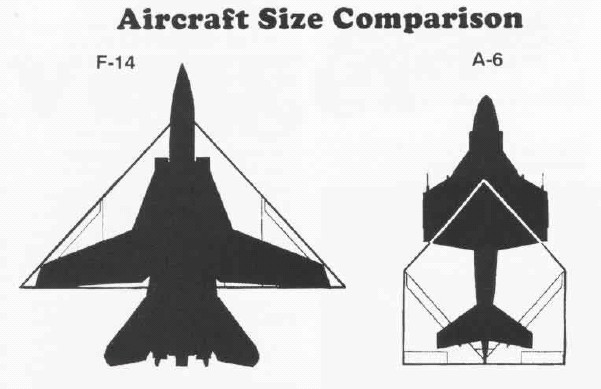
A top view of A-12 vs. Grumman F-14 Tomcat (wings spread) and Grumman A-6 Intruder (wings folded)

Data from Stealth Warplanes

General characteristics

- Crew: 2
- Length: 37 ft 10 in (11.53 m)
- Wingspan: 70 ft 3 in (21.41 m)
- Width: 36 ft 3 in (11.05 m) wings folded
- Height: 11 ft 3 in (3.43 m)
- Wing area: 1,308 sq ft (121.5 m^{2})
- Empty weight: 39,000 lb (17,690 kg)
- Max takeoff weight: 80,000 lb (36,287 kg)
- Fuel capacity: 21,322 pounds (9,700 kg) (internal)
- Powerplant: 2 × General Electric F412-GE-D5F2 turbofan engines, 13,000 lbf (58 kN) thrust each

Performance

- Maximum speed: 500 kn (580 mph, 930 km/h)
- Combat range: 800 nmi (920 mi, 1,500 km)
- Service ceiling: 40,000 ft (12,000 m)
- Rate of climb: 5,000 ft/min (25 m/s)
- Wing loading: 61 lb/sq ft (300 kg/m^{2})
- Thrust/weight: 0.325

Armament

- Payload capability: 5,160 pounds (2,300 kg) in internal weapons bay including:

- 2× AIM-120 AMRAAM air-to-air missiles
- 2× AGM-88 HARM air-to-ground missiles
- Unguided or precision-guided bombs

== See also ==
- Northrop Grumman B-2 Spirit
- Northrop Grumman X-47A Pegasus

Aircraft of comparable role, configuration, and era

- Boeing F/A-18E/F Super Hornet
- Lockheed F-117 Nighthawk
- Lockheed Martin F-35 Lightning II

Related lists

- List of attack aircraft
- List of flying wing aircraft
- List of military aircraft of the United States
