= State Secrets Doctrine =

The state secrets doctrine may refer to:

- State secrets privilege in the United States
- Official Secrets Act elsewhere
