= Silent witness rule =

US courtroom rule

The silent witness rule is the use of "substitutions" when referring to sensitive information in the United States open courtroom jury trial system. An example of a substitution method is the use of code-words on a "key card", to which witnesses and the jury would refer during the trial, but which the public would not have access to. The rule is an evidentiary doctrine that tries to balance the state secrets privilege with the bill of rights (especially the right of the accused to a public trial, and the right to due process). In practice the rule has been rarely used and was often challenged by judges and civil rights advocates. Its use remains controversial.

== Background ==
The conflict between the open court and state secrets privilege goes back to at least 1803 and Marbury v. Madison. Under the privilege, the government can dismiss any charges against it by claiming that important state secrets would be revealed at trial. In 1980 the Classified Information Procedures Act (CIPA) was passed as an attempt to deal with the conflict, especially the problem of graymail. The silent witness rule (SWR) is a further attempt.

By 2011 the government had attempted to use the rule only a handful of times, often unsuccessfully:

- United States v. Zettl 1987 (court approved, but not used due to interlocutory appeal)
- United States v. Oliver North, 1990 (court rejected the idea)
- United States v. Fernandez, 1990 (court rejected the idea)
- United States v. John Walker Lindh, 2001. The government planned to use the rule to protect the identities of US military personnel. Because Lindh made a plea bargain, the case never went to trial.
- United States v. Ahmed Abu Ali, 2005. The jury was given the full evidence, while the defendant was given redacted evidence. The Fourth Circuit later ruled this unconstitutional, a violation of the 6th Amendment's Confrontation Clause. His conviction was nevertheless upheld as it was harmless error.

=== United States v. Rosen ===
In United States v. Rosen, in 2007 (the AIPAC Espionage Act case), the rule was used for the first time. The government tried to use the rule extensively at first; the court rejected the idea. Rosen argued that the rule was invalid because it did not meet CIPA requirements. The judge, T. S. Ellis III, denied that CIPA was the only acceptable way to deal with classified information, and found that the SWR was not part of CIPA in any event. He created a four-part test to decide whether the SWR was fair. His test combined the CIPA fairness test and the Press-Enterprise Co. v. Superior Court fairness test. Ellis' approach was based on the idea that the SWR effectively "closes a trial" from the public by disclosing different sets of evidence to the court and to the public. The four parts of his test were as follows:

- There must be an overriding reason to close the trial
- The closure must be "no broader than necessary"
- There must be no alternatives
- The SWR must "provid[e] defendants with substantially the same ability to make their defense as full public disclosure of the evidence" would.

Judge Ellis found that the test was met and approved use of the SWR at trial. It was used for four minutes and six seconds of a recorded conversation. Ellis sealed the part of the record showing how the SWR figured into the proceedings.

== Arguments ==
Lamb argues that the silent witness rule would enable trials to go ahead that would otherwise be dismissed because of the state secrets privilege. He especially points out El-Masri v. Tenet, in which a German citizen was allegedly kidnapped and raped by CIA agents but was never allowed to present his case in court, and United States v. Reynolds, in which widows of Air Force contractors sued the government; both cases were dismissed because the government claimed the trial would reveal national secrets.

The rule has received media coverage for its suggested use by the government in United States v. Drake (2010). Bishop, in the Baltimore Sun, writes that lawyers say the "secret codes quickly become confusing and risk violating the defendant's constitutional rights to a public trial". Jesselyn Radack of the Government Accountability Project called it an "oxymoron", and pointed out that it "would still allow jurors to see classified information, defeating the whole purpose of classification". Josh Gerstein at Politico wrote that it might create conflict between the prosecution and the news media.

== See also ==
- State secrets privilege cases
  - Marbury v. Madison 1803
  - United States v. Burr 1807
  - Totten v. United States 1875
  - United States v. Reynolds 1953
  - El-Masri v. Tenet 2006
- Cases involving the Classified Information Procedures Act
  - United States v. Pelton 1986
  - United States v. George 1992
  - United States v. Kenneth Wayne Ford 2005
- Public trial
- Sixth Amendment to the United States Constitution

== Decisions ==
- Ellis decision on silent witness rule, US v Rosen, from fas.org
