= William Alvin Lloyd =

American would-be spy (1822 – 1869)

William Alvin Lloyd (July 4, 1822 – March 17, 1869) was an American con man and minstrel troupe impresario who, under the guise as steamboat and railroad guide publisher, claimed to be employed during the Civil War as a personal spy for President Abraham Lincoln. Lloyd along with his associates Thomas H. S. Boyd and F. J. Bonfanti were able to travel throughout the South during the war, to supposedly gather intelligence for the North. After his death, Lloyd's estate filed suit against the government for unpaid compensation. This suit resulted in the U.S. Supreme Court case Totten v. United States.

== Pre-war life ==
Born the son of a tailor in Kentucky on July 4, 1822, William A. Lloyd's family came to Louisville in 1830 where Lloyd came of age, and was apprenticed to his father until the age of twenty-one. Finally opening his own tailoring business, Lloyd married and fathered two children but abruptly left his home and family in 1846 to follow a traveling minstrel troupe, eventually assuming the duties of manager, marketer and prominent impresario. Between bouts of failure, poverty, blackmailing, swindling and serial bigamy, as he traveled throughout the Northeast and Midwest with his troupe, Lloyd was often on the run from the police, leading new minstrel bands and publishing a steamboat and railroad guide, an anti-abolitionist, southern right mouthpiece that excoriated Abraham Lincoln and his administration. When the Civil War began and his latest minstrel band folded because of his hard-handed management and his failure to pay his performers, along with his pro-Confederate stance, he decided he must go south.

== Lloyd's visit to Lincoln in 1861 ==
On July 13, 1861, William Alvin Lloyd, in desperate need of money, came to President Abraham Lincoln to request a passport to allow him travel into the Confederate States of America. The passport would allow Lloyd to do research for his guide books on railroad and steam boat transportation; it allowed him to visit the South so that he could collect advertising revenues that were owed him by Southern businessmen. According to Lloyd, Lincoln agreed to issue him the passport as part of a deal that only the two of them would ever know about, on the condition that he would act as Lincoln's personal secret agent. Lloyd claimed that Lincoln promised him a salary of $200 a month for his services. Lincoln issued passports for Lloyd, Mr. Boyd, Mr. Bonfanti, Mrs. Boyd, and her maid in July 1861. When receiving his passport, Lloyd stated that he signed a contract with Lincoln stipulating:

- He would report on the number of troops at specific points.
- He would procure the plans of the Confederacy forts and other battle structures.
- He would receive no codes or ciphers to use in his messages.
- He was to report to President Lincoln only.
- He would be paid a $200 monthly stipend, and be compensated for expenses.

== Activities in the Confederacy ==
Lloyd and his associates entered the Confederacy on 16 July 1861, at Memphis, Tennessee, and was almost immediately jailed for bigamy. Within a day or two he had bought his way out and for the next few years crisscrossed Dixie, collecting monies owed him and trying to revive his dormant "Steamboat & Railroad Guide". In the following four years Lloyd remained in the Confederacy researching for his publications, and allegedly providing human intelligence (HUMINT) to President Lincoln. Over the course of the war, Lloyd traveled across the Confederacy and spent time in: Richmond, Savannah, Chattanooga, and New Orleans. Lloyd and his business partners had a well established presence in the Confederacy prior to the war, which afforded them an easier time moving about the country. Despite their reputation, Lloyd's activities drew suspicion from government and military officials. Over the course of his four years in the Confederacy, Lloyd was incarcerated on at least four separate occasions. He was jailed in Savannah for seven months, followed immediately by two months in Macon, for being a Yankee spy. During that time one of his wives came from New York with their young son, to join him. After Lloyd's release he was a broken man but pressed on with his endeavors, for a while being the subject of harassment from the authorities. In 1863, he was shot down on the streets of Mobile, Alabama, for attempting to blackmail a citizen there. Lloyd was also questioned by authorities on many occasions, to determine his intentions. Prior to one of these interrogations Lloyd claimed he was forced to destroy the contract, which he kept inside his hat, before it was discovered.

Lloyd stated that the intelligence dispatches were used by Lincoln to check reports made from military commanders. He reported that he had difficulty in sending Lincoln intelligence due to the provisions of his contract and that he and his associates were unable to send information to the president and the Union Army, which had easier means to send dispatches via telegraph. President Lincoln did not provide Lloyd with any code or cipher system which would have allowed the encryption of the intelligence documents, which Lloyd claimed increased the risk of being exposed. Instead, Lloyd stated that he and his associates were forced to find alternate ways to send dispatches. He declared that his dispatches were often sent to members of Boyd's family living near Washington, D.C. Boyd's relatives, would supposedly then deliver the message directly to the White House. On at least one other occasion, Boyd stated he delivered a dispatch directly to President Lincoln. As a result of these dubious challenges, intelligence provided by Lloyd often lacked critical timelines and verification.

== End of the war ==
At the end of the war, in May 1865, Lloyd and his wife and child, returned to Washington. Following the assassination of Lincoln, Lloyd submitted bills for his expenses to the government. President Grant, per his papers, on May 27, 1865, endorsed reimbursement to Mr. W. Alvin Loyd and forwarded the action to the Secretary of War, Edwin Stanton, who in turn handed it to Judge Advocate Joseph Holt's office for examination. Lloyd and Enoch Totten, his attorney and now the architect of the claim, created bogus evidence including the wording of the contract Lloyd made with Lincoln and summoned witnesses to falsely depose in the case. Despite the dubious evidence, Secretary of War, Edwin Stanton issued a reimbursement for his expenses totaling $2,380. However, Stanton refused to pay Lloyd his $200 a month stipend, which would have totaled $9,753.32 at the end of the war. The payment was refused because there was no remaining copy of Lloyd's contract with President Lincoln. In spite of what might be considered unreliable information and little proof, Lloyd ultimately received $3,427.20 in gold and walked away, to pursue a variety of careers before dying on March 17, 1869.

== Totten v. United States ==
Before he died, Lloyd had been in the process of suing the government for the balance of his original claim. His widow proceeded with the new claim, again using the lawyer Enoch Totten, who now demanded $9,753.32 for his client. After Lloyd's death in 1868, the administrator of his estate, Enoch Totten, filed suit against the United States government in 1875. The suit challenged the nonpayment of Lloyd's stipend. Along with more bogus testimonies from witnesses who were never mentioned in 1865, the case went to the U.S. Court of Claims, where, although each and every jurist believed Lloyd's story, the claim was rejected, because the court felt that a president did not have the right to enter into such a contract. Totten then took the case to the Supreme Court, where, in the 1876 precedent, they also rejected it. The Supreme Court upheld the decision of the lower courts. The court cited that the six-year statute of limitations had expired on the contract and the way the suit was handled. The Supreme Court agreed that President Lincoln had the authority to hire Lloyd as a secret agent in time of war and also discussed the nature of the suit, because it violates the secret nature of the contract and duties. The Supreme Court also rejected it on the grounds that public exposure during a trial might reveal state secrets that were detrimental to the security of the United States. Lloyd's widow and Totten walked away with nothing.
