= United States v. Reese =

1876 US Supreme Court case

- Supreme Court of the United States

Argued January 30–31, 1876 Decided March 27, 1876
- Full case name: United States v. Reese
- Citations: 92 U.S. 214 (more) 23 L. Ed. 563; 1875 U.S. LEXIS 1750

Court membership
- Chief Justice Morrison Waite Associate Justices Nathan Clifford · Noah H. Swayne; Samuel F. Miller · David Davis; Stephen J. Field · William Strong; Joseph P. Bradley · Ward Hunt

Case opinions
- Majority: Waite, joined by Swayne, Miller, Davis, Field, Strong, and Bradley
- Dissent: Clifford
- Dissent: Hunt

Laws applied
- U.S. Const. amend. XV

United States v. Reese, 92 U.S. 214 (1876), was a voting rights case in which the United States Supreme Court narrowly construed the Fifteenth Amendment to the United States Constitution as not supporting the Enforcement Act of 1870 prohibition of all state voting restrictions.

== Decision ==
After a Kentucky electoral official refused to register an African American for voting in a municipal election, he was indicted under the Enforcement Act of 1870. Writing for the majority, Chief Justice Morrison Waite held the statute unenforceable as applied to non-racial voting restrictions.

== Results ==
Following the ruling, states began to adopt measures that were designed to exclude Black Americans from voting, while keeping within the constraints of the Fourteenth Amendment as interpreted by the Court. They adopted devices such as poll taxes (which many poor black and white sharecroppers, who lived on credit, did not have ready cash to pay); literacy tests, usually subjectively administered by white election officials, who tended in practice to exclude even educated Black people which was often very rare; grandfather clauses, which admitted voters whose grandfathers had voted as of a certain date, chosen to also excluded Black Americans; and more restrictive residency requirements, which disqualified people who had to move to follow work.

As these measures were challenged in court, beginning with Mississippi's new constitution in 1890 that included them, the Supreme Court upheld their use, as formally they applied to all voters. The court did not believe it had a role in overseeing the practice or effect of these measures, which white Democrats quickly used to disenfranchise most black voters across the South. Through 1910, all the former Confederate states passed new constitutions or amendments to achieve disfranchisement.
