= Chy Lung v. Freeman =

- Supreme Court of the United States

Argued January 13–14, 1876 Decided March 20, 1876
- Full case name: Chy Lung v. Freeman et al.
- Citations: 92 U.S. 275 (more) 2 Otto 275; 23 L. Ed. 550

Case history
- Prior: Appeal from the California High Court

Holding
- the federal government has the power to set rules surrounding immigration and to manage foreign relations, not the states.

Court membership
- Chief Justice Morrison Waite Associate Justices Nathan Clifford · Noah H. Swayne; Samuel F. Miller · David Davis; Stephen J. Field · William Strong; Joseph P. Bradley · Ward Hunt

Case opinion
- Majority: Miller, joined by unanimous

Laws applied
- Burlingame Treaty

Chy Lung v. Freeman, 92 U.S. 275 (1876), was a United States Supreme Court case in which the court held that the U.S. federal government has the power to set rules surrounding immigration and to manage foreign relations, not the states. The case has been cited in other Supreme Court cases related to government authority on matters relating to immigration policy and immigration enforcement, most recently in Arizona v. United States (2012).

== Background ==
Immigration from China to the Western United States, particularly California, had picked up in the mid-19th century. There was hostility to Chinese immigration from many Californian settlers, particularly among labor unions representing white laborers. The California State Legislature enacted a number of laws to make the state unwelcoming to Chinese immigration, including the Anti-Coolie Act in 1862.

The US federal government, on the other hand, was pursuing a more friendly approach to the Chinese government. In 1868, both countries agreed to the Burlingame Treaty in which China was granted most favored nation status for trade, and both countries would freely permit immigration of the citizens of the other country but without any promise of a path to citizenship. Indeed, the Naturalization Act of 1870 explicitly restricted naturalization to blacks and whites, but citizenship at birth was still open to all, as the Supreme Court would affirm in United States v. Wong Kim Ark (1898).

In 1875, California passed a statute authorizing the immigration commissioner to inspect passengers arriving in California at a cost of 75 cents per inspection, which was levied on the passenger, and giving him the authority to deny entry to passengers who were suspected of being lewd and debauched. However, those suspected could still be allowed entry if the captain of the ship paid a bond for them.

=== Similar statutes and associated court cases ===
Two other United States states, New York and Louisiana, had similar statutes, which were challenged around the same time:

- Henderson v. Mayor of City of New York, 92 U.S. 259 (1875): A lawsuit by the owners of the steamship Ethiopia from Great Britain, which had arrived at New York City, challenged the statutes of New York and Louisiana that required the owner of a ship to post a bond for landing immigrants to cover indemnities if they proved to need state assistance. The court ruled in favor of the plaintiffs and argued that the power to set immigration policy rested with the federal government. It decided that the requirement of a bond was a policy with a sufficiently significant impact on international movement to be the exclusive domain of the federal government.
- Commissioners of Immigration v. North German Lloyd was a case that involved almost identical circumstances.

== Facts ==
There were 22 women from China, including Chy Lung, among the passengers on the steamer Japan that journeyed from China to San Francisco, arriving on August 24, 1874. The immigration commissioner examined the passengers and identified Chy Lung and the other women as "lewd and debauched women." The captain of the ship had the option of paying a $500 bond (equivalent to $15,100 in 2025) per woman to allow her to land for the ostensible purpose to "indemnify all the counties, towns, and cities of California against liability for her support or maintenance for two years," but the captain refused to pay the bond and detained the women on board.

They sued out a writ of habeas corpus, which led to them being moved into the custody of the Sheriff of the County and City of San Francisco, where they stayed awaiting deportation upon the return of Japan, which had already left for China.

The women refused to be deported to China and appealed the decision to deport them. The California Supreme Court upheld the constitutionality of the statute that was used to deny them entry, and it upheld their deportation. The women appealed the decision in the US Supreme Court, the first case to appear there that involved a Chinese litigant.

== Decision ==
Justice Stephen Johnson Field ordered the release of all of the women from the sheriff's custody. However, Chy Lung still pressed the case to the Supreme Court and sought to test the constitutionality of the statute that had been used to imprison her and her companions.

On October 1, 1875, the Supreme Court decided unanimously in favor of Chy Lung. Its primary argument was that the federal government, rather than that of the states, was in charge of immigration policy and diplomatic relations with other nations. Therefore, it was not up to California to impose restrictions on Chinese immigration. The Supreme Court also noted that the action by California could jeopardize foreign relations for the US government by running afoul of its treaty obligations.

The Supreme Court noted that although states could make reasonable and necessary regulations concerning paupers and convicted criminals, the statute went far beyond that and was therefore extortionary.

The court was also critical of the government of California, the Commissioner of Immigration, and the Sheriff of San Francisco for not presenting any arguments on their behalf in the case.

The court was also critical of the lack of due process governing the immigration commissioner's decisions to mark particular immigrants as lewd and debauched.

== See also ==
- Good moral character
- Moral turpitude
- Chae Chan Ping v. United States
- Arizona v. United States
- Page Act of 1875
