= Custer Battles =

Former American defense contractor

- Industry: Defense contractor
- Founded: October 2001
- Founder: Scott Custer and Michael Battles
- Defunct: 2006
- Headquarters: Middletown, Rhode Island, United States
- Area served: Iraq

Custer Battles, LLC was an American defense contractor headquartered in Middletown, Rhode Island, with offices in McLean, Virginia. The company now appears to be out of business. At one time the company offered services that include security services, litigation support, global risk consulting, training and business intelligence, but had no background or track record in offering any of these services.

In June 2003, Custer Battles took its services to Iraq and became a minor contractor supporting the Coalition Provisional Authority and the U.S. government. In October 2004, the company was sued under the False Claims Act. As this was the first lawsuit concerning contractors in Iraq, the company received significant attention throughout the media. In March 2006, a jury ruled against Custer Battles, but the verdict was set aside by a District Court judge. That decision was appealed, and, in April 2009, the Fourth Circuit reversed the district court judge and granted a new trial.

According to the Iraq War documents leak, a Custer Battles convoy went on a shooting spree in Umm Qasr in 2004, shooting out the tire of a civilian car that came close, and firing five shots into a crowded civilian minibus. The shooting stopped only after the Iraqi police, port security and a British military unit finally caught up with the convoy. Custer Battles employees handed over cash to avoid disciplinary action.

== Background ==
Custer Battles, LLC., was founded in October 2001. The company was named after its founders, Scott Custer and Michael Battles. Custer is a former Army Ranger and defense consultant, while Battles is a former Army officer and CIA intelligence officer who ran unsuccessfully for the United States Congress in Rhode Island in 2002. The company described itself as follows:"Custer Battles, LLC, an international business risk consultancy, is a veteran owned business that provides objective risk management and security consulting services of the highest quality and within an ethical framework." It offered prospective clients an array of services ranging from global risk consulting to close personal security detail to weapons training and Foreign Corrupt Practices Act (FCPA)/Human Rights Violations inquiries, among others.

From 2001-2003, Custer Battles provided crisis management and security assistance to humanitarian organizations working in high-risk conflict areas throughout the world. They were one of the first companies to establish a presence in Kabul, Afghanistan in January 2002, working for various NGOs as well as the Afghan Ministry of Transportation. Domestically, they also provided critical infrastructure protection in the United States, with focus on water security. They had at least four statewide contracts in 2002, including New Hampshire, Rhode Island, Maine, Nevada, as well as contracts with various municipalities along the eastern seaboard.

In May 2003, Custer Battles established a presence in Baghdad, Iraq. In June 2003, Custer Battles was competitively awarded a contract to secure the Baghdad International Airport (BIAP). The 12-month contract with the Coalition Provisional Authority was worth $16.8 million. The company continued to expand its business in Iraq, and became a minor subcontractor operating in the country hiring 138 people for providing security at BIAP.

The company continued to expand its operations in Iraq through 2003 and 2004. Their clients included the Coalition Provisional Authority, Bearing Point, Washington Group International, Parsons Corporation, Halliburton and the United States Army. In early 2004, the United States Department of Defense initiated an investigation into one of Custer Battles' contracts with the CPA, resulting in the company being suspended from future contract considerations. In early 2005, Custer Battles ceased operations in Iraq.

== Allegations of fraud in Iraq ==
=== Dinar exchange contract ===
From May 2003 to June 28, 2004, the Coalition Provisional Authority (CPA) was the governing body of Iraq. In July 2003, the CPA started to replace the old Iraqi dinars with portrait of Saddam Hussein with a new currency. On August 27, 2003, Custer Battles, LLC., signed a Dinar Exchange Contract with the CPA to construct and operate three money exchange facilities, in Baghdad, Mosul, and Basra. It was a Cost-Plus contract with reimbursement for actual expenses, plus 25% for overhead and profit. During signing, the $3-million advance paid with a U.S. Treasury check was handed over; a total of approximately $15 million was paid by the CPA to Custer Battles. At the end of the contract time, a document came into possession of the CPA which demonstrated that Custer Battles, LLC., inflated the invoices, for example, it charged $400,000 for electric generators for Baghdad facility while they were acquired for $74,000.

In October 2004, a qui tam lawsuit against Custer Battles, LLC. was filed by Robert Isakson and William Baldwin, who both were employees of DRC, Inc., a Custer Battles' subcontractor. It was unsealed in the United States District Court for the Eastern District of Virginia. The suit, United States ex rel. DRC, Inc. v. Custer Battles, LLC, 472 F. Supp. 2d 787 (E.D. Va. 2007), brought under the False Claims Act, alleged massive over-billing on two contracts with the Coalition Provisional Authority in Iraq in 2003.

In July 2005, Judge T. S. Ellis III ruled that allegations of false claims in Custer Battles' contracts with the CPA were actionable under the False Claims Act, denying Custer Battles' lawyers claims that the company had no contract with the US government. The Judge also ruled that money paid for by the Development Funds for Iraq (DFI) could not be prosecuted under the False Claims Act, as the US government was not involved in administering these funds. In March 2006, a jury found Custer Battles liable for the submission of 5 false claims, each one of which is subject to a US$5,000 -11,000 civil fine, as well as 26 false statements supporting the 5 false claims. However, in August 2006, Judge Ellis overturned the verdict as a matter of law.

Judge Ellis's ruling was, in turn, reversed in part by the United States Court of Appeals for the Fourth Circuit in April 2009 on grounds that claims submitted by Custer Battles fell under the FCA, in effect reinstating the jury verdict. Judge Paul V. Niemeyer in United States ex rel. DRC, Inc., et al. v. Custer Battles, LLC, et al., 562 F.3d 295 (4th Cir. 2009), ruled that District Court had erred in limiting the scope of the damages on the dinar exchange contract, and gave the plaintiffs the option of seeking a new trial for additional damages., but reinstated the claims relating to the dinar-exchange contract and reversed the order limiting them to $30 million in damages granting a right for another trial.

=== Baghdad airport security ===
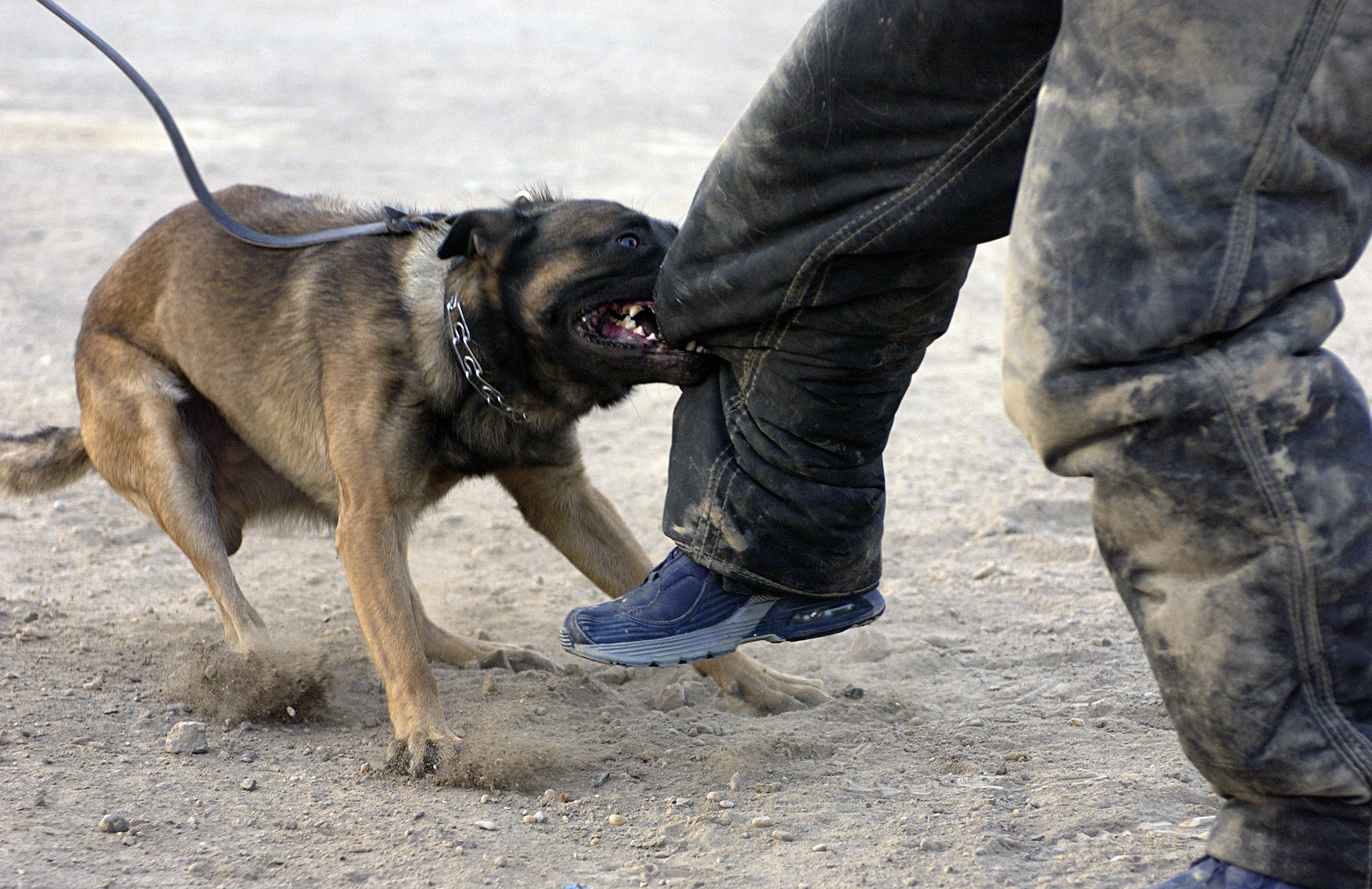
A Custer Battles K-9 unit tackles a man in a protective suit during a training session at Baghdad International Airport, 2003.

In addition to Dinar Exchange Contract, the CPA signed a separate Firm-Fixed Price $16.8 million contract awarded to Custer Battles to provide security at Baghdad International Airport to open it to commercial flights. Custer Battles assumed responsibility for establishing armed patrols and checkpoints, training an airport police force, and certified baggage screeners; altogether — 138 personnel. Coalition Authority's administrator responsible for transportation, Franklin D. Hatfield, stated that the contract was fulfilled "far above and beyond what was required".

The same set of whistleblowers, Robert Isakson, a former Federal Bureau of Investigation agent and DRC's managing director, and William Baldwin, a former Custer Battles employee, maintained under the False Claims Act that Custer Battles, LLC., defrauded the United States by not maintaining the agreed upon number of airport security staff, with Baldwin additionally claiming that he was fired in retaliation for his whistleblowing.

During trial, Judge T. S. Ellis III ruled that the entire contract was susceptible to the False Claims Act, and not just part of it in the previous case. The basic allegations were that Custer Battles had failed to provide adequate security staffing under its Firm-Fixed Price contract of $16.8 million. In January 2007, Judge Ellis granted Custer Battles' motion for summary judgment, finding that there was no evidence of the submission of false claims in this case. In April 2009, the 4th Circuit appeals court affirmed summary judgment for Custer Battles on the Baghdad airport contract. Therefore, the Airport Contract claim was denied legal standing but the Dinar Exchange Contract and retaliation claims from the Airport Contract proceeded to trial.

== Custer Battles files conspiracy lawsuit ==
In April 2005, Custer Battles filed conspiracy and breach of contract lawsuits against Robert Isakson and William Baldwin, the same individuals who had previously accused Custer Battles of submitting false claims. The lawsuit also included Isakson and Baldwin's companies, DRC Inc and American Iraqi Solutions Group, both of Alabama. According to court documents filed in the U.S. District Court for the Eastern District of Virginia, Mr. Isakson breached his contract with Custer Battles when he brought his 12-year-old son to Iraq by vehicle from Amman, Jordan with $9,000 in cash strapped to his chest.

Custer Battles also alleged that Isakson and Baldwin conspired to start a new company, American Iraqi Solutions Group (AISG) and stole away Custer Battles clients. This case was eventually moved from the United States District Court for the Eastern District of Virginia to the United States District Court for the Southern District of Alabama. Before going to trial, a settlement was reached and Custer Battles dismissed the charges. The amount of money paid by DRC, Isakson and Baldwin has been kept confidential.

== Allegations of unrestrained force ==
In February 2005, Lisa Myers of MSNBC News reported a story concerning allegations of unrestrained force on the part of Custer Battles security operators in Iraq. In the story, four former Custer Battles employees are quoted as witnessing an incident where a Custer Battles vehicle rolled over a civilian vehicle and injured the occupants inside. The employees also detail an incident where Kurdish guards shot indiscriminately towards Iraqi civilians. According to one of the employees, Bill Craun, "what we saw the American public wouldn't stand for."

In response to the allegations, Myers interviewed the Iraq director and convoy leader for Custer Battles. The convoy leader, Shawn Greene, adamantly denied that any of these incidents occurred, and detailed the exact incident in which he ordered the Custer Battles truck to hit and forcibly move a civilian vehicle. According to Greene, while his vehicle did damage the civilian car, there were no injuries. Paul Christopher, the Custer Battles country director, provided NBC News access to the company's mission logs, which detailed the event of hitting a civilian vehicle, the subsequent investigation with photos, and the documentation from the driver and witnesses that no one was injured. Both Greene and Christopher did detail accounts of actual combat situation of Custer Battles personnel where their vehicles were attacked by insurgents and Custer Battles personnel were forced to defend themselves through the use of deadly force.

== Jacqueline Battles arrested trying to secrete funds ==
In September 2006, Jacqueline Battles, the wife of Michael Battles, was arrested in Germany after a German bank informed authorities about "suspicious transactions" on her accounts. German investigators seized about US$1 million from her accounts. Jacqueline Battles was subsequently released and no charges were filed.

== In the courts ==
- United States ex rel. DRC, Inc. v. Custer Battles, LLC ("DRC I"), 376 F. Supp. 2d 617 (E.D. Va. 2005) — the motion was granted in part.
- United States ex rel. DRC, Inc. v. Custer Battles, LLC, 472 F. Supp. 2d 787 (E.D. Va. 2007) — the district court determined the relator failed to establish presentment of claims..
- United States ex rel. Rory Mayberry v. Custer Battles, LLC, Case No. 1:06-cv-364 (E.D. Va. 2008) — the case was dismissed in its entirety.
- United States ex rel. DRC, Inc., et al. v. Custer Battles, LLC, et al., 562 F.3d 295 (4th Cir. 2009), Case No. 07-1220 — the appellate court gave the plaintiffs the option of seeking a new trial.

== In the media ==
- Daylight Robbery: fleecing Iraq and the USA. BBC Aired June 10, 2008.
- Billions Wasted In Iraq? By Jennifer MacDonald/Ira Rosen, CBS Broadcasting. Aired February 12, 2006.
- U.S. contractors in Iraq allege abuses: Four men say they witnessed brutality. By Lisa Myers and the NBC investigative unit. NBC Nightly News. Aired February 17, 2005.
- I'm From the Private Sector and I'm Here to Help. By Nancy Updike, This American Life. Aired June 4, 2004. An examination of the presence and motives of Custer Battles as a contractor in Iraq, including interviews with Hank Keirsey, a retired Army Lt. Colonel, a significant character in Absolutely American by David Lipsky.
