= Phillips v. Payne =

- Supreme Court of the United States

Decided October 1, 1875
- Full case name: Phillips v. Payne
- Citations: 92 U.S. 130 (more) 2 Otto 130; 23 L. Ed. 649

Case history
- Prior: Appeal from the Court of Claims

Holding
- A taxpayer does not have standing to challenge the validity of retrocession, because whether a state controls a territory is based on its de facto control, not whether the state has a de jure right to control it.

Court membership
- Chief Justice Morrison Waite Associate Justices Nathan Clifford · Noah H. Swayne; Samuel F. Miller · David Davis; Stephen J. Field · William Strong; Joseph P. Bradley · Ward Hunt

Case opinion
- Majority: Swayne, joined by unanimous

Phillips v. Payne, 92 U.S. 130 (1875), was a United States Supreme Court case in which the court held that a taxpayer does not have standing to challenge the validity of retrocession, because whether a state controls a territory is based on its de facto control, not whether the state has a de jure right to control it. The court observed that since 1847, pursuant to the act of Congress of the preceding year, the State of Virginia had been in de facto possession of the County of Alexandria, which, prior thereto, formed a part of the District of Columbia. This reclamation of the land was called retrocession. The court did not reach the question of whether retrocession was unconstitutional.

The theory that the United States recognizes territorial sovereignty based on the fact of territorial rule rather than the right to rule has been rejected since Phillips.
