= Totten v. United States =

- Supreme Court of the United States

Decided April 10, 1876
- Full case name: Totten, Administrator, v. United States
- Citations: 92 U.S. 105 (more) 23 L. Ed. 605; 1876 U.S. LEXIS 1732; 2 Otto 105

Case history
- Prior: Appeal from the Court of Claims

Holding
- The court deemed that an oral contract between a deceased spy and President Lincoln was unenforcable because the very process of consideration in a court might do harm by making public the details of a secret enterprise.

Court membership
- Chief Justice Morrison Waite Associate Justices Nathan Clifford · Noah H. Swayne; Samuel F. Miller · David Davis; Stephen J. Field · William Strong; Joseph P. Bradley · Ward Hunt

Case opinion
- Majority: Field, joined by unanimous

Totten v. United States, 92 U.S. 105 (1876), is a United States Supreme Court case in which the court ruled on judicial jurisdiction in espionage cases. The case was an important precursor to the court's 1953 decision in United States v. Reynolds wherein it recognized the State Secrets Privilege. The case was later referenced and its holding expanded by the Court in the 2005 case of Tenet v. Doe and then again in General Dynamics Corp. v. United States. In Tenet, which involved a contract claim against the CIA brought by Cold War era spies, Court clarified that “Totten precludes judicial review in cases . . . where success depends upon the existence of their secret espionage relationship with the government.” In General Dynamics, the Court held that the same logic applied outside the espionage context, with the limitation that “[b]oth parties—the government no less than petitioners—must have assumed the risk that state secrets would prevent the adjudication of claims of inadequate performance."

== Overview ==
William Alvin Lloyd was employed as a Union spy by President Abraham Lincoln. Lloyd claimed that he was to be paid $200 per month but was ultimately only reimbursed for expenses incurred in the course of his service. After his death, Lloyd's estate, represented by its executor Enoch Totten, filed suit to recover the promised wages. The United States Court of Claims found as a factual matter that Lloyd had proceeded under contract as a spy but the court was equally divided on whether the President of the United States could unilaterally bind the government to such a contract and opted to dismiss the claim. The Supreme Court took the case and affirmed the lower court's dismissal on the basis that certain secret contracts could not be publicly reviewed by courts.

== Issues ==
May a federal court review questions of law related to secret spy contracts, or is such review precluded by some form of executive privilege or the law of contracts?

== Holding ==
The court deemed that an oral contract between a deceased spy and President Lincoln was unenforceable because the very process of consideration in a court might do harm by making public the details of a secret enterprise.

Writing for the majority, Justice Field held:

[P]ublic policy forbids the maintenance of any suit in a court of justice, the trial of which would inevitably lead to the disclosure of matters which the law itself regards as confidential, and respecting which it will not allow the confidence to be violated. . . . Much greater reason exists for the application of the principle to cases of contract for secret services with the government, as the existence of a contract of that kind is itself a fact not to be disclosed.

Judgment affirmed.

== Facts and background ==
In July 1861, in the midst of the American Civil War, William Alvin Lloyd was allegedly recruited as a Union spy by President Abraham Lincoln. His mission was to collect intelligence on the movements and positioning of Confederate States of America troops and other information useful to the Union war effort. Lloyd entered the Confederacy on July 16, 1861, at Memphis, Tennessee and was almost immediately jailed for an unrelated crime. Within a day or two he had bought his way out and over the course of the war spent time in Virginia, Georgia, Tennessee, and Louisiana.

Although the exact details of the employment contract were disputed—and the only other party, President Lincoln, had been assassinated—Lloyd claimed that he was to be paid $200 per month for his service, which would have totaled $9,753.32 by the end of the war. But rather than paying him in full, Secretary of War Edwin Stanton agreed to reimburse Lloyd only for expenses incurred in the course of his service, totaling $2,380. After his death, Lloyd's estate, represented by its executor Enoch Totten, filed suit to recover the promised wages.

By the time the suit was filed both Lloyd and President Lincoln, the only two parties to the original oral contract, had died. There was thus little substantive evidence of the original contract upon which decide the case. Nevertheless, the United States Court of Claims found as a factual matter that Lloyd had proceeded to the Confederate States under contract to spy on President Lincoln's behalf. But the court was equally divided on whether the President of the United States had the authority to unilaterally bind the government to such a contract and opted to dismiss the claim.

The Supreme Court took Totten's appeal.

== Opinion ==
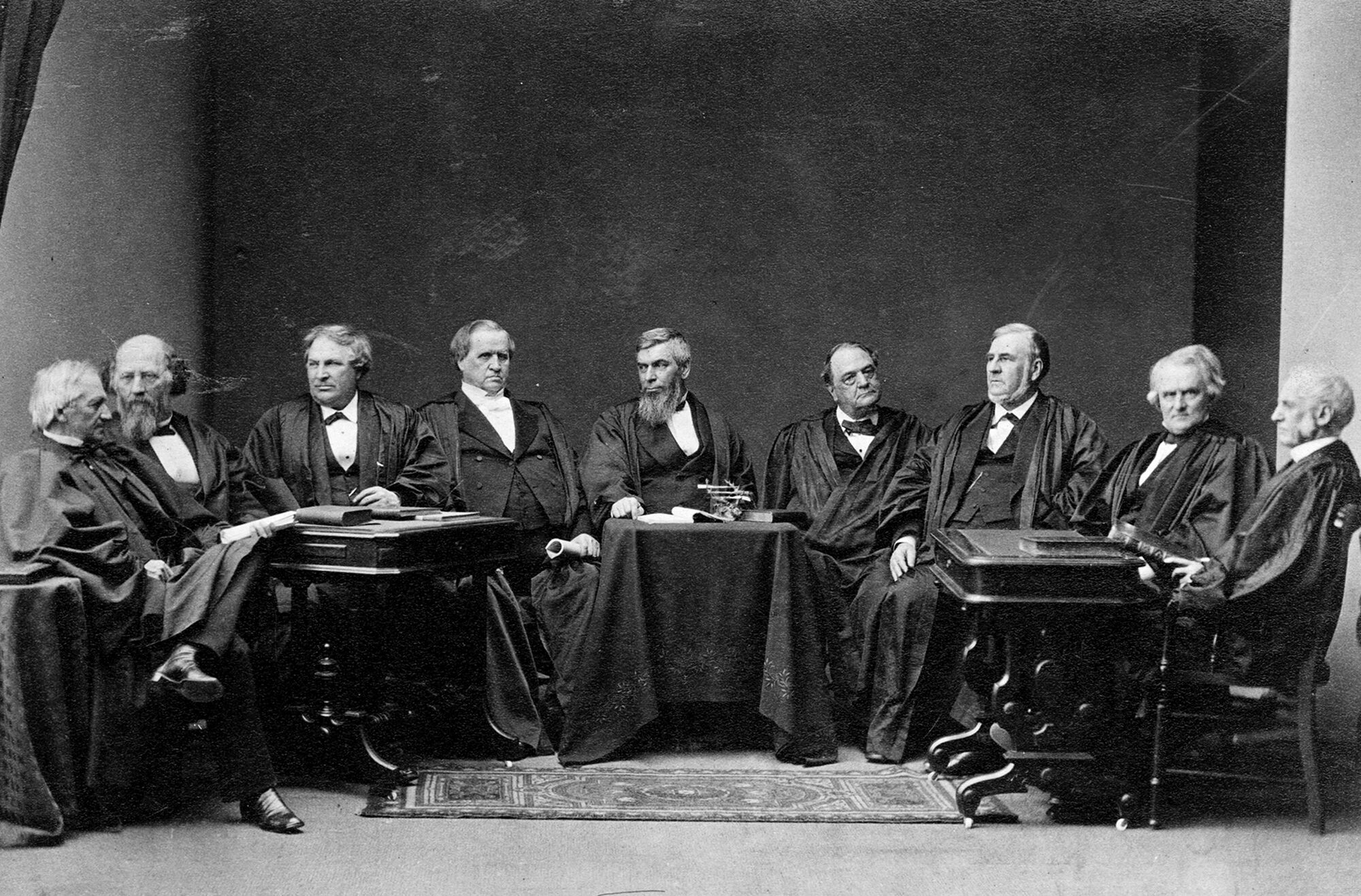
The Waite Court in 1876.

In a unanimous opinion authored by Justice Stephen J. Field, the Supreme Court affirmed the Court of Claims's dismissal of the case. "It may be stated as a general principle," wrote Justice Field, "that public policy forbids the maintenance of any suit in a court of justice, the trial of which would inevitably lead to the disclosure of matters which the law itself regards as confidential, and respecting which it will not allow the confidence to be violated." Citing a number of well-established evidentiary privileges such as those given to communications between spouses, clients and their attorneys, and penitents and clergy, the Court concluded that "[m]uch greater reason exists for the application of the principle to cases of contract for secret services with the government, as the existence of a contract of that kind is itself a fact not to be disclosed."

== Significance ==
Legal historians have identified Totten as an early expression of the State Secrets Privilege later formally adopted by the Supreme Court in United States v. Reynolds. There is one important distinction, however, between the State Secrets Privilege as endorsed by the Supreme Court in United States v. Reynolds and the privilege applied in Totten: under the Reynolds privilege, individual pieces of evidence may be excluded from the record at the government's behest, but the stronger Totten form of the privilege compels dismissal of entire cases where their subject matter is claimed to be too secret for proceedings in open court. This so-called "Totten Bar" to jurisdiction has been controversial, because rather than eliminating access to particular evidence it often results in dismissal without recourse. Nevertheless, the privileges described and applied in Reynolds and Totten are often understood as two related varieties of the same general privilege.

The precise scope of Totten's holding was unclear until 2005. Before the Supreme Court decided Tenet v. Doe in 2005, it appeared that the reasoning of the Totten court might be confined to cases involving espionage where a plaintiff has voluntarily agreed to secrecy and thus contracted away their right to sue. But Tenet clarified that “Totten precludes judicial review in cases . . . where success depends upon the existence of their secret espionage relationship with the government.” Then, finally, General Dynamics Corp. v. United States held that the same logic applies even outside the espionage context, so long as “[b]oth parties—the government no less than petitioners—must have assumed the risk that state secrets would prevent the adjudication of claims of inadequate performance."

== See also ==
- William Alvin Lloyd
- Tenet v. Doe
- General Dynamics Corp. v. United States
- State Secrets Privilege
