= Graymail =

Threatened revelation of state secrets

Graymail is a form of coercion similar to blackmail wherein a defendant threatens revelation of state secrets during a trial. Graymail is used as a defense tactic, usually in an attempt to force the government to drop a case to avoid revealing national secrets.

== Overview ==
Graymail can occur in two ways:

1. To straightforwardly blackmail the government, forcing it to drop the case using the threat that if the trial proceeds the defendant will reveal classified information he or she already knows.
2. To request use of classified material, e.g. as evidence, in the trial. The defendant speculates that the government will be unwilling to make the material fully available to the case, and that this will raise the possibility, in the eyes of the judge or jury, that the unreleased material might clear the defendant, making it difficult to prove guilt.

In the United States, the Classified Information Procedures Act of 1980, also known as the Graymail Law, was designed to counter the second tactic above by allowing judges to review classified material in camera, so that the prosecution can proceed without fear of publicly disclosing sensitive intelligence.

== Examples ==
- John D. Cline was a defense attorney for Oliver North and successfully used graymail to dismiss the most serious charges against North in the Iran–Contra affair. Among his detractors, Cline is known as a graymail specialist. In November 2005, Cline was hired by Lewis Libby's defense team, and requested more than 10 months of the President's Daily Brief. In spite of this, Libby was found guilty on four of the five charges.
- Katharine Gun was a translator for Government Communications Headquarters. In 2003, she became publicly known for leaking top-secret information to the press concerning alleged illegal activities by the United States in their push for the 2003 invasion of Iraq. She was charged under section 1 of the Official Secrets Act 1989, but the case was dropped when the prosecution declined to offer evidence.
- Terrance Brown, an accused robber of bank delivery vehicles in Florida, attempted to subpoena NSA records of his cellphone location to provide an alibi after it emerged that his cellphone provider had deleted the data some years previously. Legal commentators speculated that the motion was an attempt to force the government to drop charges, since the case going to trial would set a precedent for the disclosure of NSA data collection practices in public legal proceedings. The NSA stated that it had not collected any cellphone location information relevant to his case.

== See also ==
- National security
- Silent witness rule
