= T. S. Ellis III =

American judge (1940–2025)

Senior Judge of the United States District Court for the Eastern District of Virginia
- In office April 1, 2007 – July 30, 2025

Judge of the United States District Court for the Eastern District of Virginia
- In office August 6, 1987 – April 1, 2007
- Appointed by: Ronald Reagan
- Preceded by: Robert R. Merhige Jr.
- Succeeded by: Mark Steven Davis

Personal details
- Born: Thomas Selby Ellis III; May 15, 1940 Bogotá, Colombia
- Died: July 30, 2025 (aged 85) Keswick, Virginia, U.S.
- Spouses: Martha Anne Reed (m. 1964; div. 1993); Rebecca Garrou (m. 1995)
- Children: 2
- Education: Princeton University (BSE); Harvard University (JD); Magdalen College, Oxford (GDL)

Military service
- Allegiance: United States
- Branch: United States Navy
- Service years: 1961–1967
- Rank: Lieutenant

Thomas Selby Ellis III (May 15, 1940 – July 30, 2025) was a United States district judge of the United States District Court for the Eastern District of Virginia, appointed by Ronald Reagan.

== Background ==
Thomas Selby Ellis III was born on May 15, 1940, in Bogotá, Colombia, where his family resided at the time for his father's career as an executive in the oil industry. Ellis graduated from Princeton University where he earned a Bachelor of Science in Engineering in 1961. Ellis served in the United States Navy as a Naval aviator from 1961 to 1967. Ellis earned a Juris Doctor magna cum laude from Harvard Law School in 1969. Harvard awarded Ellis a Knox Fellowship for study in England. He then received a Diploma in Law in 1970 from Magdalen College, Oxford. Ellis then entered private practice with the law firm of Hunton & Williams (now Hunton Andrews Kurth), based in Virginia, where he remained until 1987. His practice included a wide range of commercial litigation matters. He often worked with fellow Hunton & Williams attorney John Charles Thomas, who became Virginia's first African-American Supreme Court Justice. Ellis also was a lecturer at the College of William and Mary, from 1981 to 1983.

== Federal judicial service ==
Ellis was nominated by President Ronald Reagan on July 1, 1987, to a seat on the United States District Court for the Eastern District of Virginia vacated by Judge Robert R. Merhige Jr. He was confirmed by the United States Senate on August 5, 1987, and received his commission on August 6, 1987. He took senior status on April 1, 2007.

=== Notable cases ===
==== John Walker Lindh ====
Ellis presided over the plea bargain and sentencing of John Walker Lindh. He imposed a sentence of 20 years for two charges, aiding the Taliban and carrying weapons while committing a felony. He also imposed the Son of Sam law, banning him from profiting from books written about his case.

==== Franklin, Rosen, and Weissman ====
On January 20, 2006, Ellis sentenced former Defense Department employee Lawrence Franklin to 12 years and 7 months in prison and a $10,000 fine for passing national defense information to an Israeli diplomat and AIPAC, a pro-Israel lobby group. In 2009, he altered the sentence to 10 months at a halfway house and community service, but chastised Franklin for not following "the rule of law".

On August 9, 2006, Ellis denied a motion to dismiss the case of two former AIPAC employees. Steve Rosen and Keith Weissman were charged under the Espionage Act with illegally receiving and transmitting national defense information. Ellis wrote:

…both common sense and the relevant precedent point persuasively to the conclusion that the government can punish those outside of the government for the unauthorized receipt and deliberate retransmission of information relating to the national defense." (p. 53)

United States v. Rosen was also a pioneering use of the silent witness rule in a courtroom. The rule allows for sensitive (classified, or otherwise) evidence to be hidden from the public, but available to the jury & counsel, by the use of "substitution" of code-words using a "key card," to which witnesses and the jury would refer during the trial, but which the public would not have access to. Most previous attempts by the government to use the rule had been banned by various judges or the case had been settled before trial. Ellis was the first to allow it, although he limited it to 4 minutes of use at trial, and devised a "fairness test" as to whether the rule should be allowed, and to how much it would make the trial "closed." Critics worried about the Fifth Amendment due process and Sixth amendment Confrontation Clause implications of the use of this rule. In particular, Ellis described it as a "partial closing" of the trial, while the Sixth Amendment guarantees a public trial.

==== Khalid El-Masri ====
On Thursday, May 18, 2006, Ellis dismissed a lawsuit filed by Khalid El-Masri, a German citizen, against the Central Intelligence Agency and three private companies allegedly involved with his kidnapping, transport, and torture in Kabul. Ellis explained his belief that a public trial would "present a grave risk of injury to national security", though acknowledging that:

If El-Masri's allegations are true or essentially true, then all fair-minded people, including those who believe that state secrets must be protected, that this lawsuit cannot proceed, and that renditions are a necessary step to take in this war, must also agree that El-Masri has suffered injuries as a result of our country's mistake and deserves a remedy.

==== Paul Manafort ====
In March 2018, Ellis assumed control over a set of criminal charges against Paul Manafort, former chair of the 2016 Donald Trump presidential campaign. The 18 counts filed in Virginia federal court include tax evasion and bank fraud, and are in addition to earlier charges filed in a Washington, D.C. court. The government alleges that Manafort, with assistance from his associate Rick Gates, laundered over $30 million through offshore bank accounts between approximately 2006 and 2015. On March 13 Ellis ordered Manafort held on $10 million bond and home confinement with GPS monitoring. He set a trial date of July 10, 2018.

Manafort challenged Special Counsel Robert Mueller's authority to bring these charges. In a May 4 hearing on the challenge, Ellis repeatedly suggested that the prosecutors were not really interested in prosecuting the charges but had filed them to exert pressure on Manafort to cooperate with the special counsel's investigation into Trump. Ellis said he would rule on Manafort's challenge at a later date. On June 26, 2018, Ellis issued an opinion stating that "upon further review" the Mueller investigation had acted within its authority, clearing the way for Manafort's trial to proceed.

On July 31, 2018, a jury was seated, both sides made their opening statements, and the first prosecution witness was called. In subsequent days prosecutors continued to present their case as Ellis repeatedly urged them to proceed expeditiously. Nancy Gertner, a former federal judge, described Ellis's behavior − repeatedly interrupting and arguing with prosecutors in the presence of the jury − as "decidedly unusual" and appearing to show bias against the prosecution. On the other hand, a legal analyst and former prosecutor remarked that Ellis's conduct was typical of a "move along" judge—jurists who tightly enforce courtroom rules and thereby insulate a case from appeal in the event of a conviction. On the eighth day of the trial Ellis apologized for one of his comments, saying “It appears I may well have been wrong. But like any human, and this robe doesn’t make me anything other than human, I sometimes make mistakes."

While the jury was deliberating, the judge revealed that he had been threatened and was being guarded by deputy U.S. marshals.

On August 21, the jury found Manafort guilty on eight of the 18 charges, while the judge declared a mistrial on the other 10. He was convicted on five counts of tax fraud, one of the four counts of failing to disclose his foreign bank accounts, and two counts of bank fraud. The jury was hung on three of the four counts of failing to disclose, as well as five counts of bank fraud, four of them related to the Federal Savings Bank of Chicago, whose CEO had been seeking a position in the administration.

On March 7, 2019, Ellis sentenced Manafort to 47 months in federal prison, citing excessive sentencing guidelines that called for up to 25 years in prison and said that Manafort had "lived an otherwise blameless life." In Manafort's related criminal proceedings in the United States District Court for the District of Columbia, Manafort received an additional 43-month sentence.

==== Others ====
- In 2007, Ellis presided over the trial in United States ex rel. DRC, Inc. v. Custer Battles, LLC, 472 F. Supp. 2d 787 (E.D. Va. 2007).
- In 2009, he was the judge in the corruption case of former United States Representative William J. Jefferson, who was convicted.
- In May 2019 he sentenced Kevin Mallory to 20 years in prison for performing espionage on behalf of the Chinese government.
- In 2022, he sent a "strong recommendation" that Islamic State militant Alexanda Kotey should serve 8 life sentences in a lower security prison than ADX Florence, for his "mental and physical” health. The Bureau of Prisons disregarded this recommendation, and Kotey is now held in ADX Florence.
- He also was the judge in the lawsuit against Anne Sacoolas, it was eventually settled out of court for an undisclosed amount.

== Personal life and death ==
In 1964, Ellis married Martha Reed; they had two children and divorced in 1993. Two years later, he married Rebecca Garrou.

Ellis died at his home in Keswick, Virginia, on July 30, 2025, from complications of COVID-19 at the age of 85.

== See also ==
- False Claims Act
- Espionage Act
- First Amendment
- AIPAC espionage scandal
- Classified Information Procedures Act

Legal offices
Preceded by Robert R. Merhige Jr.	Judge of the United States District Court for the Eastern District of Virginia; 1987–2007	Succeeded by Mark Steven Davis
