= Tenet v. Doe =

- Supreme Court of the United States

Argued January 11, 2005 Decided March 2, 2005
- Full case name: George J. Tenet, Individually, Porter J. Goss, Director of Central Intelligence and Director of the Central Intelligence Agency, and United States, Petitioners v. John Doe et ux.
- Docket no.: 03–1395
- Citations: 544 U.S. 1 (more) 125 S. Ct. 1230; 161 L. Ed. 2d 82

Holding
- Spies cannot sue the United States government to enforce espionage contracts.

Court membership
- Chief Justice William Rehnquist Associate Justices John P. Stevens · Sandra Day O'Connor; Antonin Scalia · Anthony Kennedy; David Souter · Clarence Thomas; Ruth Bader Ginsburg · Stephen Breyer

Case opinions
- Majority: Rehnquist, joined by unanimous
- Concurrence: Stevens, joined by Ginsburg
- Concurrence: Scalia

Tenet v. Doe, 544 U.S. 1 (2005), is a United States Supreme Court case in which the court ruled unanimously that spies (those recruited for espionage by the Central Intelligence Agency) cannot sue the CIA or the United States government to enforce an espionage contract. The court ruled that allowing such suits jeopardize the protection of state secrets.

== Background ==
This case pitted Doe and his wife against the CIA. Doe, a high-ranking Soviet diplomat, was recruited by the CIA for espionage against Soviet Union during the Cold War. When he was recruited, the CIA promised to resettle him, and his wife, in the United States and ensure financial security for life. The couple settled in Washington state, where Doe found employment. His salary increased to the point that he agreed to discontinue the CIA benefits while he was working. Years later, in 1997, Doe was laid off. Unable to find new employment, due to restrictions by the CIA on the types of jobs he could hold, he then contacted the CIA to reinstate the financial assistance. That request was denied by the CIA, which provided no avenue for Doe to appeal the decision.

== Decision ==
Doe brought the suit before the U.S. District Court for the Western District of Washington. The District Court denied the Government's motions to dismiss and the case eventually made its way to the U.S. Supreme Court.

The Supreme Court considered this case in light of the 1876 case, Totten v. United States, which prevented a spy from suing the United States to enforce a secret espionage contract. In considering Tenet v. Doe, the Supreme Court upheld the Totten v. United States decision. Therefore, the law continues to deny Doe and other spies the right to sue the United States and the CIA for alleged violations of espionage agreements. The court considered it to be of the utmost importance, "rather than tempt fate", to maintain the secrecy of these agreements.
