= Public trial =

Conflict resolution in a tribunal before the people

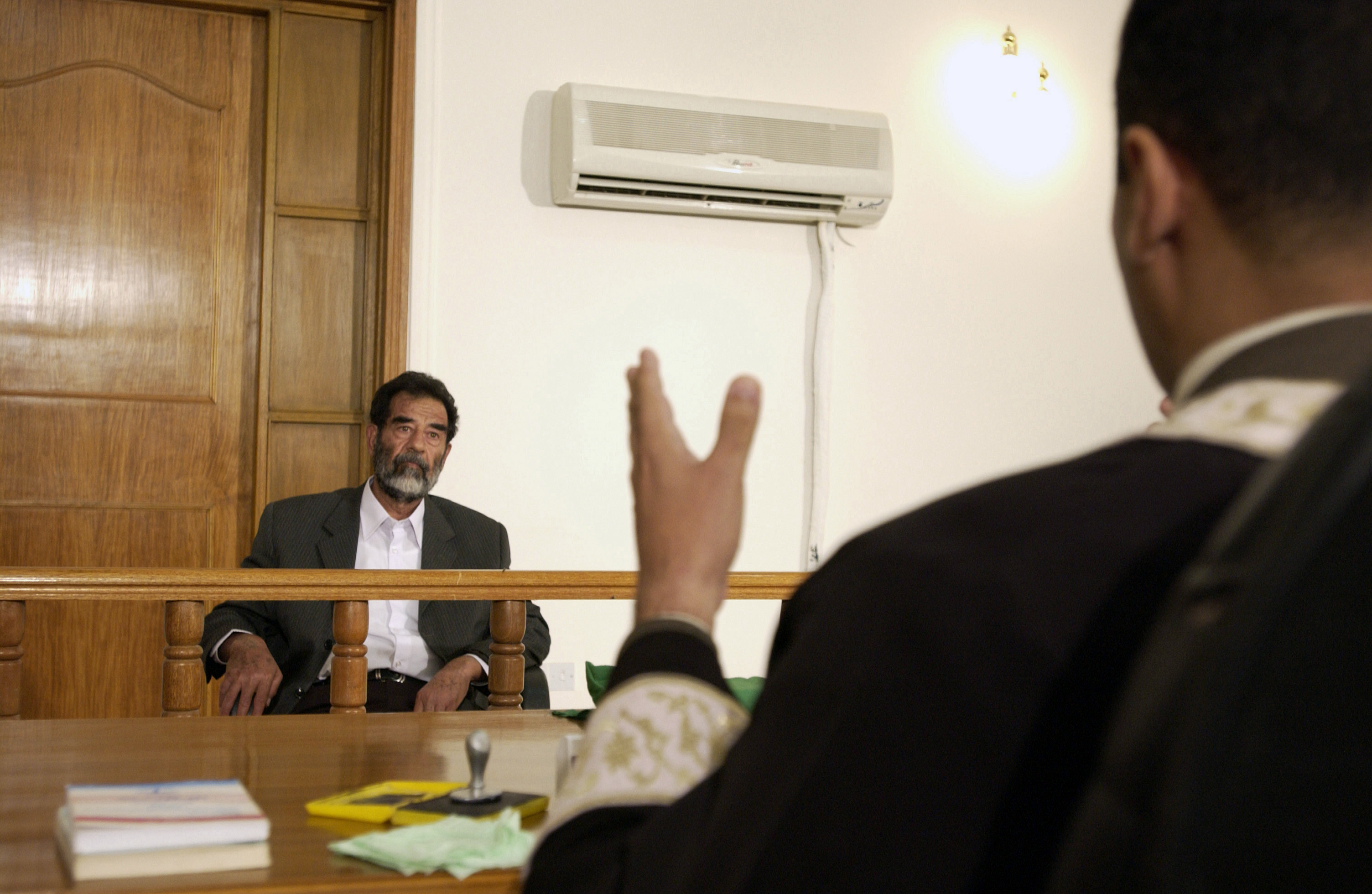
Trial of Saddam Hussein

Public trial or open trial is a trial that is open to the public, as opposed to a secret trial. It should not be confused with a show trial.

== United States ==
The Sixth Amendment to the United States Constitution establishes the right of the accused to a public trial.

The right to a public trial is strictly enforced, but is not absolute. Trials may in exceptional cases be regulated. Closures are decided case-by-case by the judge evaluating a claimed danger to a substantial or legitimate public interest. But whatever the interest at stake, the likelihood of danger to that interest must meet a "'substantial probability' test". Examples of cases presenting closure issues include organized crime cases (overall security concerns), rape cases (decency concerns), juvenile cases, and through the Silent witness rule and/or Classified Information Procedures Act, cases involving sensitive or "classified" information.

Trials may be closed at the behest of the government only if it can show "an overriding interest based on findings that closure is essential to preserve higher values and is narrowly tailored to serve that interest". The accused may also request a closure of the trial; in such a case, it must be demonstrated that "first, there is a substantial probability that the defendant's right to a fair trial will be prejudiced by publicity that closure would prevent, and second, reasonable alternatives to closure cannot adequately protect the defendant's fair trial rights".

But before a judge can close a courtroom, the judge must consider all potential alternatives to closure. This is a very strict standard; the Supreme Court has held that "trial courts are required to consider alternatives to closure even when they are not offered by the parties," or by anyone else. In other words, a judge who does not want to be reversed on appeal must be confident that there cannot possibly be any alternative to closure that might later be conjured up by some appellate lawyer.

== Canada ==
Pursuant to the open court principle and related legislation, legal proceedings are generally open to the public and the media.

Section 135(1) of the Courts of Justice Act (Ontario) states the general principle that "all court hearings shall be open to the public". In Quebec, however, under the Quebec Act 1774, the French legal system (including non-public trials) was allowed to remain intact, including the lack of a requirement that trials be public.

== Soviet Union ==
In Soviet Union the terms "open trial" (открытый процесс) and "public trial" (публичный процесс) differed. The term "open trial" implied the possibility for public to be present at the hearings. The term "public trial" implied the purposeful presentation of the process to wide public. Public trials were usually widely discussed in media and hearings were often arranged in larger auditoria. While the Soviet public trials are commonly associated with Stalin era show trials, such as Moscow Trials, nevertheless in Russian culture the term "public trial" did not acquire negative connotations, despite the apparent attributes of a show, primarily because the publicity of any information in pre-glasnost era was severely limited by the Soviet state. The term "show trial" corresponds to Russian "показной процесс" (pokaznoy process).

== See also ==
- Open court principle
- Silent witness rule
- Classified Information Procedures Act
- United States v. Franklin
- Thomas Andrews Drake
