= List of United States Supreme Court cases, volume 92 =

Supreme Court of the United States
- Interactive map of Supreme Court of the United States
- 38°53′26″N 77°00′16″W
- Established: March 4, 1789; 237 years ago
- Location: Washington, D.C.
- Coordinates: 38°53′26″N 77°00′16″W
- Composition method: Presidential nomination with Senate confirmation
- Authorised by: Constitution of the United States, Art. III, § 1
- Judge term length: life tenure, subject to impeachment and removal
- Number of positions: 9 (by statute)
- Website: supremecourt.gov

This is a list of cases reported in volume 92 of United States Reports, decided by the Supreme Court of the United States in 1876, along with two cases from 1875.

== Justices of the Supreme Court at the time of 92 U.S. ==
The Supreme Court is established by Article III, Section 1 of the Constitution of the United States, which says: "The judicial Power of the United States, shall be vested in one supreme Court . . .". The size of the Court is not specified; the Constitution leaves it to Congress to set the number of justices. Under the Judiciary Act of 1789 Congress originally fixed the number of justices at six (one chief justice and five associate justices). Since 1789 Congress has varied the size of the Court from six to seven, nine, ten, and back to nine justices (always including one chief justice).

When the cases in 92 U.S. were decided the Court comprised the following nine members:

Portrait	Justice	Office	Home State	Succeeded	Date confirmed by the Senate (Vote)	Tenure on Supreme Court
	Morrison Waite	Chief Justice	Ohio	Salmon P. Chase	January 21, 1874 (63–0)	March 4, 1874 – March 23, 1888 (Died)
	Nathan Clifford	Associate Justice	Maine	Benjamin Robbins Curtis	January 12, 1858 (26–23)	January 21, 1858 – July 25, 1881 (Died)
	Noah Haynes Swayne	Associate Justice	Ohio	John McLean	January 24, 1862 (38–1)	January 27, 1862 – January 24, 1881 (Retired)
	Samuel Freeman Miller	Associate Justice	Iowa	Peter Vivian Daniel	July 16, 1862 (Acclamation)	July 21, 1862 – October 13, 1890 (Died)
	David Davis	Associate Justice	Illinois	John Archibald Campbell	December 8, 1862 (Acclamation)	December 10, 1862 – March 4, 1877 (Resigned)
	Stephen Johnson Field	Associate Justice	California	newly created seat	March 10, 1863 (Acclamation)	May 10, 1863 – December 1, 1897 (Retired)
	William Strong	Associate Justice	Pennsylvania	Robert Cooper Grier	February 18, 1870 (No vote recorded)	March 14, 1870 – December 14, 1880 (Retired)
	Joseph P. Bradley	Associate Justice	New Jersey	newly created seat	March 21, 1870 (46–9)	March 23, 1870 – January 22, 1892 (Died)
	Ward Hunt	Associate Justice	New York	Samuel Nelson	December 11, 1872 (Acclamation)	January 9, 1873 – January 27, 1882 (Retired)

== Notable Cases in 92 U.S. ==
=== United States v. Reese ===
United States v. Reese, 92 U.S. 214 (1876), was a voting rights case in which the Supreme Court narrowly construed the Fifteenth Amendment to the United States Constitution, which provides that suffrage for citizens can not be restricted due to race, color, or the individual having previously been a slave. The Court held that the 15th Amendment did not confer the right of suffrage, but only prohibited exclusion on racial grounds from a pre-existing right to vote.

=== Chy Lung v Freeman ===
Chy Lung v. Freeman, 92 U.S. 275 (1876), involved 22 women from China, including Chy Lung, among the passengers on the steamer Japan that journeyed from China to San Francisco, arriving in 1875. The immigration commissioner examined the passengers and, acting under a California statute, identified Chy Lung and the others as "lewd and debauched women". The captain detained the women on board. The women obtained a writ of habeas corpus, which led to them being moved into the custody of the Sheriff of San Francisco, where they stayed awaiting deportation upon the return of Japan, which had already left for China. The women refused to be deported to China and appealed the decision to deport them. The California Supreme Court upheld the constitutionality of the statute that was used to deny them entry, and it upheld their deportation. The women appealed the decision in the US Supreme Court. The Court decided unanimously in favor of Chy Lung. It held that the federal government, and not state governments, was in charge of immigration policy and diplomatic relations with other nations; it was not up to California to impose restrictions on Chinese immigration.

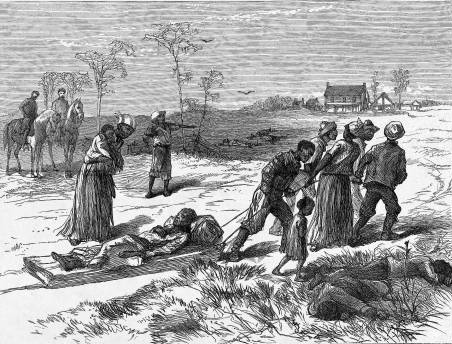
Aftermath of the Colfax Massacre, 1873

=== United States v. Cruikshank ===
In United States v. Cruikshank, 92 U.S. 542 (1876), the Court held that the Bill of Rights did not apply to private actors or to state governments despite the adoption of the Fourteenth Amendment. The decision represented a major blow to federal efforts to protect the civil rights of African Americans. The case arose from the hotly-disputed 1872 Louisiana gubernatorial election and the subsequent Colfax massacre, in which dozens of black people and three white people were killed. Federal charges were brought against several white insurgents under the Enforcement Act of 1870, which prohibited two or more people from conspiring to deprive anyone of their constitutional rights. Charges included hindering the freedmen's First Amendment right to freely assemble and their Second Amendment right to keep and bear arms. In his majority opinion, Chief Justice Morrison Waite overturned the convictions of the defendants, holding that the plaintiffs had to rely on state courts for protection. Waite opined that neither the First Amendment nor the Second Amendment applied to the actions of state governments or to individuals, but only to the federal government; also that the Due Process Clause and the Equal Protection Clause of the Fourteenth Amendment applied to the actions of state governments, but not to individuals. The decision left African Americans in the South at the mercy of increasingly hostile state governments dominated by white Democratic legislatures, and allowed groups such as the Ku Klux Klan to continue to use paramilitary force to suppress black voting.

== Citation style ==
Under the Judiciary Act of 1789 the federal court structure at the time comprised District Courts, which had general trial jurisdiction; Circuit Courts, which had mixed trial and appellate (from the US District Courts) jurisdiction; and the United States Supreme Court, which had appellate jurisdiction over the federal District and Circuit courts—and for certain issues over state courts. The Supreme Court also had limited original jurisdiction (i.e., in which cases could be filed directly with the Supreme Court without first having been heard by a lower federal or state court). There were one or more federal District Courts and/or Circuit Courts in each state, territory, or other geographical region.

Bluebook citation style is used for case names, citations, and jurisdictions.

- "C.C.D." = United States Circuit Court for the District of . . .
  - e.g.,"C.C.D.N.J." = United States Circuit Court for the District of New Jersey
- "D." = United States District Court for the District of . . .
  - e.g.,"D. Mass." = United States District Court for the District of Massachusetts
- "E." = Eastern; "M." = Middle; "N." = Northern; "S." = Southern; "W." = Western
  - e.g.,"C.C.S.D.N.Y." = United States Circuit Court for the Southern District of New York
  - e.g.,"M.D. Ala." = United States District Court for the Middle District of Alabama
- "Ct. Cl." = United States Court of Claims
- The abbreviation of a state's name alone indicates the highest appellate court in that state's judiciary at the time.
  - e.g.,"Pa." = Supreme Court of Pennsylvania
  - e.g.,"Me." = Supreme Judicial Court of Maine

== List of cases in 92 U.S. ==
Case Name	Page and year	Opinion of the Court	Concurring opinion(s)	Dissenting opinion(s)	Lower Court	Disposition
Blease v. Garlington	1 (1876)	Waite	none	none	C.C.D.S.C.	affirmed
Gaines v. Fuentes	10 (1876)	Field	none	Bradley	La.	reversed
Hall v. United States	27 (1876)	Swayne	none	none	Ct. Cl.	affirmed
The City of Washington	31 (1876)	Clifford	none	none	C.C.E.D.N.Y.	affirmed
Roberts v. United States	41 (1876)	Bradley	none	Swayne	Ct. Cl.	reversed
Farnsworth v. Minnesota and Pacific Railroad Company	49 (1876)	Field	none	none	C.C.D. Minn.	affirmed
Shuey v. United States	73 (1876)	Strong	none	none	Ct. Cl.	affirmed
United States v. Landers	77 (1876)	Field	none	none	Ct. Cl.	reversed
O'Brien v. Weld	81 (1876)	Hunt	none	none	N.Y. Sup. Ct.	reversed
Cheatham v. United States	85 (1876)	Miller	none	none	C.C.M.D. Tenn.	affirmed
Walker v. Sauvinet	90 (1876)	Waite	none	none	La.	affirmed
Magee v. Manhattan Life Insurance Company	93 (1876)	Swayne	none	none	C.C.S.D. Ala.	affirmed
Neblett v. MacFarland	101 (1876)	Hunt	none	none	C.C.D. La.	affirmed
Totten v. United States	105 (1876)	Field	none	none	Ct. Cl.	affirmed
Stott v. Rutherford	107 (1876)	Swayne	none	none	Sup. Ct. D.C.	reversed
Harrison v. Myer	111 (1876)	Clifford	none	none	La.	affirmed
Kittredge v. Race	116 (1876)	Bradley	none	none	C.C.D. La.	affirmed
First National Bank v. National Exchange Bank	122 (1876)	Waite	none	none	Md.	affirmed
Rockhold v. Rockhold	129 (1876)	Waite	none	none	Tenn.	dismissed
Phillips v. Payne	130 (1876)	Swayne	none	none	Sup. Ct. D.C.	affirmed
Wills v. Claflin	135 (1876)	Davis	none	none	C.C.N.D. Ill.	affirmed
Markey v. Langley	142 (1876)	Swayne	none	none	C.C.D.S.C.	affirmed
Terry v. Tubman	156 (1876)	Hunt	none	none	C.C.S.D. Ga.	affirmed
Hoffman v. John Hancock Mutual Life Insurance Company	161 (1876)	Swayne	none	none	C.C.N.D. Ohio	affirmed
Whitfield v. United States	165 (1876)	Waite	none	none	Ct. Cl.	affirmed
Carey v. Brown	171 (1875)	Swayne	none	none	C.C.D. La.	affirmed
Baker v. White	176 (1876)	Miller	none	none	C.C.D. Conn.	dismissed
Burbank v. Bigelow	179 (1876)	Bradley	none	none	C.C.D. La.	reversed
Smith v. Vodges	183 (1876)	Swayne	none	none	C.C.E.D. Pa.	reversed
Lamar v. Browne	187 (1876)	Waite	none	Field	C.C.D. Mass.	affirmed
Wallach v. Van Riswick	202 (1876)	Strong	none	none	Sup. Ct. D.C.	reversed
United States v. Reese	214 (1876)	Waite	none	Clifford; Hunt	C.C.D. Ky.	affirmed
Montgomery v. Bucyrus Machine Works	257 (1876)	Davis	none	none	C.C.W.D. Mo.	affirmed
Henderson v. City of New York	259 (1876)	Miller	none	none	C.C.S.D.N.Y.	reversed
Chy Lung v. Freeman	275 (1876)	Miller	none	none	Cal.	reversed
United States v. Ross	281 (1876)	Strong	none	none	Ct. Cl.	reversed
New York Life Insurance Company v. Hendren	286 (1876)	Waite	none	Bradley	Va.	dismissed
Elmwood Township v. Marcy	289 (1876)	Davis	none	Strong	C.C.N.D. Ill.	reversed
Chamberlain v. St. Paul and Sioux City Railroad Company	299 (1876)	Field	none	none	C.C.D. Minn.	affirmed
Laramie County v. Albany County	307 (1876)	Clifford	none	none	Sup. Ct. Terr. Wyo.	affirmed
Republican River Bridge Company v. Kansas Pacific Railway Company	315 (1876)	Miller	none	none	Kan.	affirmed
Wilson v. Boyce	320 (1876)	Hunt	none	none	C.C.E.D. Mo.	affirmed
Brown v. Atwell	327 (1876)	Waite	none	none	N.Y. Sup. Ct.	dismissed
Angle v. Northwestern Mutual Life Insurance Company	330 (1876)	Clifford	none	none	C.C.D. Iowa	reversed
Oaksmith's Lessee v. Johnson	343 (1876)	Field	none	none	Sup. Ct. D.C.	affirmed
Reckendorfer v. Faber	347 (1876)	Hunt	none	Strong	C.C.S.D.N.Y.	affirmed
Potts v. Chumasero	358 (1876)	Waite	none	none	Sup. Ct. Terr. Mont.	dismissed
Scammon v. Kimball	362 (1876)	Clifford	none	none	C.C.N.D. Ill.	reversed
Pace v. Burgess	372 (1876)	Bradley	none	none	C.C.E.D. Va.	affirmed
Piedmont and Arlington Life Insurance Company v. Ewing	377 (1876)	Miller	none	none	C.C.W.D. Mo.	reversed
Savage v. United States	382 (1876)	Clifford	none	none	Ct. Cl.	affirmed
Smeltzer v. White	390 (1876)	Strong	none	none	C.C.D. Iowa	affirmed
Hobson v. Lord	397 (1876)	Clifford	none	Bradley	C.C.S.D.N.Y.	affirmed
Butler v. Thomson	412 (1876)	Hunt	none	none	C.C.S.D.N.Y.	reversed
Clements v. Macheboeuf	418 (1876)	Clifford	none	none	Sup. Ct. Terr. Colo.	affirmed
Ives v. Hamilton	426 (1876)	Bradley	none	none	C.C.E.D. Mich.	affirmed
The America	432 (1876)	Clifford	none	none	C.C.S.D.N.Y.	reversed
The Galatea	439 (1876)	Clifford	none	none	C.C.S.D.N.Y.	reversed
Otis v. Cullum	447 (1876)	Swayne	none	none	C.C.D. Kan.	affirmed
Barney v. Watson	449 (1876)	Bradley	none	none	C.C.S.D.N.Y.	reversed
Terry v. Commercial Bank of Alabama	454 (1876)	Miller	none	none	C.C.S.D. Ala.	affirmed
Williams v. United States	457 (1876)	Clifford	none	none	D. Cal.	affirmed
City of St Louis v. United States	462 (1876)	Miller	none	none	Ct. Cl.	affirmed
Tyng v. Grinnell	467 (1876)	Clifford	none	none	C.C.S.D.N.Y.	affirmed
Miller v. Dale	473 (1876)	Field	none	none	Cal.	affirmed
Kennard v. Louisiana ex rel. Morgan	480 (1876)	Waite	none	none	La.	affirmed
Town of Coloma v. Eaves	484 (1876)	Strong	Bradley	none	C.C.N.D. Ill.	affirmed
Town of Venice v. Murdock	494 (1876)	Strong	none	none	C.C.N.D.N.Y.	affirmed
Town of Genoa v. Woodruff	502 (1876)	Strong	none	none	C.C.N.D.N.Y.	affirmed
Converse v. City of Ft. Scott	503 (1876)	Strong	none	none	C.C.N.D. Kan.	reversed
Carrol v. Green	509 (1876)	Swayne	none	none	C.C.D.S.C.	reversed
Franklin Fire Insurance Company v. Vaughan	516 (1876)	Hunt	none	none	C.C.E.D. Ark.	affirmed
United States v. Diekelman	520 (1876)	Waite	none	none	Ct. Cl.	reversed
Board of Liquidation of Louisiana v. McComb	531 (1876)	Bradley	none	none	C.C.D. La.	multiple
United States v. Cruikshank	542 (1876)	Waite	none	Clifford	C.C.D. La.	affirmed
Harshman v. Bates County	569 (1876)	Bradley	none	none	C.C.W.D. Mo.	affirmed
State Railroad Tax Cases	575 (1876)	Miller	none	none	C.C.N.D. Ill.	reversed
Lewis v. United States	618 (1876)	Swayne	none	none	C.C.E.D. Pa.	affirmed
Town of Concord v. Portsmouth Savings Bank	625 (1876)	Strong	none	none	C.C.N.D. Ill.	reversed
Moultrie County v. Rockingham Ten-Cent Savings Bank	631 (1876)	Strong	none	none	C.C.S.D. Ill.	affirmed
Marcy v. Oswego Township	637 (1876)	Strong	none	none	C.C.D. Kan.	reversed
Humboldt Township v. Long	642 (1876)	Strong	none	Miller	C.C.D. Kan.	affirmed
Intermingled Cotton Cases	651 (1876)	Waite	none	none	Ct. Cl.	affirmed
Morrison v. Jackson	654 (1876)	Clifford	none	none	C.C.E.D. Mo.	affirmed
Central Railroad and Banking Company of Georgia v. Georgia	665 (1876)	Strong	none	none	Ga.	reversed
South-Western Railroad and Banking Company of Georgia v. Georgia	676 (1876)	Strong	none	none	Ga.	reversed
Branch v. City of Charleston	677 (1876)	Bradley	none	none	C.C.D.S.C.	affirmed
Garsed v. Beall	684 (1876)	Clifford	none	none	C.C.S.D. Ga.	affirmed
The Alabama	695 (1876)	Bradley	none	none	C.C.S.D.N.Y.	reversed
Hot Springs Cases	698 (1876)	Bradley	none	none	Ct. Cl.	affirmed
Burdell v. Denig	716 (1876)	Miller	none	none	C.C.S.D. Ohio	reversed
McStay v. Friedman	723 (1876)	Waite	none	none	Cal.	dismissed
Hammond v. Mason and Hamlin Organ Company	724 (1876)	Miller	none	none	C.C.D. Mass.	affirmed
Hall v. Weare	728 (1876)	Strong	none	none	C.C.N.D. Ill.	reversed
Leavenworth, Lawrence and Galveston Railroad Company v. United States	733 (1876)	Davis	none	Field	C.C.D. Kan.	affirmed
Missouri, Kansas, and Texas Railway Company v. United States	760 (1875)	Davis	none	none	C.C.D. Kan.	affirmed
Newhall v. Sanger	761 (1876)	Davis	none	Field	C.C.D. Cal.	reversed
