= General Dynamics Corp. v. United States =

- Supreme Court of the United States

Argued January 18, 2011 Decided May 23, 2011
- Full case name: General Dynamics Corporation, Petitioner v. United States
- Docket no.: 09–1298
- Citations: 563 U.S. 478 (more) 73 S.Ct. 528; 97 L. Ed. 727; 2011 U.S. LEXIS 3830

Case history
- Prior: McDonnell Douglas Corp. v. United States, 76 Fed. Cl. 385 (2007); affirmed, 567 F.3d 1340 (Fed. Cir. 2009); cert. granted, 561 U.S. 1057 (2010).

Holding
- When litigation would end up disclosing state secrets, courts may not try the claims and may not award relief to either party.

Court membership
- Chief Justice John Roberts Associate Justices Antonin Scalia · Anthony Kennedy; Clarence Thomas · Ruth Bader Ginsburg; Stephen Breyer · Samuel Alito; Sonia Sotomayor · Elena Kagan

Case opinion
- Majority: Scalia, joined by unanimous

General Dynamics Corp. v. United States (consolidated with The Boeing Co. v. United States), 563 U.S. 478 (2011), is a U.S. Supreme Court case in which the State Secrets Privilege prevented the plaintiff from using the evidence it needed to protect itself from an expensive judgement.

== Background ==
In 1988 the U.S. Navy ordered a new stealth aircraft, the A-12 Avenger, to be built by contractors General Dynamics and McDonnell Douglas. The parties agreed to what would be the main problem with the contract: instead of a "cost-reimbursable" contract (which would have limited the contractors' liability to the funding provided by the Government, and is the most commonly used when dealing with new weapons systems, especially with new technology), they agreed to a "fixed-price" contract (which required the contractors to complete the work regardless of final cost) of around US$4.8 billion (the competing industry team, composed of contractors Northrop, Grumman, and Vought, somewhat surprisingly never submitted a final bid and dropped out of the competition, possibly due to the intended contract type).

Not unexpectedly (given the nature of the program) the contract encountered difficulty in meeting the technical requirements, which resulted in huge cost overruns, but in this case the overruns (combined with the contract type) threatened the existence of both companies, two of the largest United States defense contractors. The contractors requested that the fixed-price contract be converted to a cost-reimbursable contract, agreeing to absorb $150 million in cost overruns as consideration. Instead, in 1991 the Navy gave up and cancelled the contract, saying too little progress had been made. Yet the cancellation would cause another problem: instead of cancelling the contract as a "termination for convenience" (where the Government decides it no longer wants an item; this may require the Government to spend additional funds to make a contractor whole), it instead chose to cancel it as a "termination for default" (where the Government cancels a contract upon belief that the contractor is not performing in accordance with contract terms, and often demands repayment of funds provided), and asked the contractors to return roughly US$1.35 billion of "progress payments" (payments based upon work performed) already made. The contractors refused, saying the government had kept too much information secret under the "state secrets privilege" for there to be adequate progress, and therefore a default termination was not justified.

The manner in which the program was canceled led to years of litigation between the contractors and the Department of Defense over breach of contract:

- Initially the United States Court of Federal Claims agreed with the contractors, changing the termination for default into a termination for convenience (the contractors sought US$1.2 billion in total costs under such a termination); however, the United States Court of Appeals for the Federal Circuit reversed the decision and remanded the case back to the Court of Federal Claims. (But during discovery, on at least two separate occasions inadvertent disclosure of classified information took place, forcing the Court to halt further discovery.)
- Upon remand, the Court of Federal Claims then sided with the Government, ordering a repayment; however, the Court of Appeals for the Federal Circuit again reversed and remanded.
- On the second remand, the Court of Federal Claims again sided with the Government; this time, on 1 June 2009, the Court of Appeals for the Federal Circuit upheld the lower court's ruling that the U.S. Navy was justified in canceling the contract. The ruling also required the two contractors to repay the U.S. government the roughly US$1.35 billion it initially sought, plus interest charges, making the total owed around US$1.45 billion. Boeing (which had acquired McDonnell Douglas) and General Dynamics (which by then had sold its military aircraft business to Lockheed Martin, but as part of the sale retained its rights in this case) vowed to appeal the ruling.

In September 2010, the U.S. Supreme Court said it would hear the arguments of the two companies that the government canceled the project improperly and that the use of a state secrets claim by the U.S. prevented them from mounting an effective defense.

== Opinion of the Court ==
In May 2011, the Supreme Court set aside the Appeals Court decision and returned the case to it "for proceedings consistent with this opinion". The Court unanimously held that "when litigation would end up disclosing state secrets, courts may not try the claims and may not award relief to either party." Thus it neither granted the contractors the US$1.2 billion awarded in the earlier termination for convenience, nor the Navy the roughly US$1.35 billion in prior payments made.

In January 2014, the case was settled with Boeing and General Dynamics agreeing to pay US$400 million to the Navy, equally divided between them.

== See also ==
- United States v. Reynolds
- Classified information in the United States
