= State Secrets Protection Act =

The State Secrets Protection Act, S. 2533, ("SSPA") was a bill first proposed in the U.S. Senate during the 110th Congress by Senators Kennedy, Leahy, and Specter on January 22, 2008.

The SSPA legislation was initially proposed in the 110th Congress in response to the government's assertions of the State Secrets Privilege in cases challenging the constitutionality of several of the Bush administration's national security programs, including the warrantless wiretapping, rendition and interrogation programs.

== History ==
Similar legislation was also introduced in the House, H.R. 5607, during the 110th Congress. Senator Kennedy put out a press release explaining the rationale behind introducing the SSPA. Hearings were held before the Senate Judiciary Committee on February 13, 2008. On Thursday, April 24, the committee approved the proposed legislation, voting 11–8 to send the bill to the full Senate for consideration.

=== Re-introduction ===
Leading members of the Senate Judiciary Committee of the 111th Congress have joined to re-introduce the State Secrets Protection Act, S. 417, ("SSPA"), a bill that provides guidance to federal courts considering cases in which the government has asserted the State Secrets Privilege. Senate Judiciary Committee Chairman Patrick Leahy (D-Vt.), Ranking Member Arlen Specter (R-Pa.), and Committee Member Russ Feingold (D-Wis.) joined with former Committee Chairman and Member Edward Kennedy (D-Ma.) to introduce the bill on Wednesday, February 11, 2009. Similar legislation, H.R. 984, was also introduced in the House on the same day.

== Reception ==
In a March 31, 2008 letter to Senator Leahy, Attorney General Michael B. Mukasey expressed strong Bush Administration opposition to the legislation, saying in his letter that the bill "would needlessly and improperly interfere with the appropriate constitutional role of both the Judicial and Executive branches in state secrets cases; would alter decades of settled case law; and would likely result in the harmful disclosure of national security information that would not be disclosed under current doctrine."

Numerous scholars and non-governmental organizations (including the American Civil Liberties Union, the American Bar Association, the Constitution Project, and the Brennan Center for Justice) issued responses to the Attorney General's letter refuting his criticisms of the bill. These scholars and organizations noted that current laws surrounding State Secrets allow much room for abuse, and claimed that taking a new approach would not jeopardize security in any manner because each case would be left to the discretion of US courts (who have acted in good faith with regard to national security in the past).
