= Classified Information Procedures Act =

1980 US federal law covering state secrets

- Other short titles: Classified Information Procedures Act of 1980
- Long title: An Act to provide certain pretrial, trial, and appellate procedures for criminal cases involving classified information.
- Acronyms (colloquial): CIPA, CICTPA
- Nicknames: Classified Information Criminal Trial Procedures Act
- Enacted by: the 96th United States Congress
- Effective: October 15, 1980

Citations
- Public law: 96-456
- Statutes at Large: 94 Stat. 2025

Codification
- Titles amended: 18 U.S.C.: Crimes and Criminal Procedure
- U.S.C. sections created: 18 U.S.C. Appendix §§ 1-16

Legislative history
- Introduced in the Senate as S. 1482 by Joe Biden (D–DE) on July 11, 1979; Committee consideration by Senate Judiciary, House Intelligence (Permanent), House Judiciary; Passed the Senate on June 25, 1980 (Passed); Passed the House on September 22, 1980 (Passed, in lieu of H.R. 4736); Reported by the joint conference committee on September 30, 1980; agreed to by the Senate on September 30, 1980 (Agreed) and by the House on October 2, 1980 (Agreed); Signed into law by President Jimmy Carter on October 15, 1980

The Classified Information Procedures Act or CIPA (Pub. L. 96–456, 94 Stat. 2025, enacted October 15, 1980 through S. 1482) is codified as the third appendix to Title 18 of the U.S. Code, the title concerning crimes and criminal procedures. The U.S. Code citation is 18 U.S.C. App. III. Sections 1-16.

== Legislative revision history ==
The hidden table below lists the acts of Congress that affected the act directly. The years in which the legislative revisions were made appear in bold text preceding the Public Laws that enacted them. The links to the codification and the section notes may provide additional information about the legislative changes, as well.

USC Title 18 - Appendix - Sequence III - Classified Information Procedures Act

§ 1. Definitions

Codified to 18A U.S.C. § 1 | notes

[Source: Added by section 1 of the Act of October 15, **1980** (Pub. L. 96–-456; 94 Stat. 2025), effective October 15, 1980]

§ 2. Pretrial conference

Codified to 18A U.S.C. § 2 | notes

[Source: Added by section 2 of the Act of October 15, **1980** (Pub. L. 96–-456; 94 Stat. 2025), effective October 15, 1980]

§ 3. Protective orders

Codified to 18A U.S.C. § 3 | notes

[Source: Added by section 3 of the Act of October 15, **1980** (Pub. L. 96–-456; 94 Stat. 2025), effective October 15, 1980]

§ 4. Discovery of classified information by defendants

Codified to 18A U.S.C. § 4 | notes

[Source: Added by section 4 of the Act of October 15, **1980** (Pub. L. 96–-456; 94 Stat. 2025), effective October 15, 1980]

§ 5. Notice of defendant's intention to disclose classified information

Codified to 18A U.S.C. § 5 | notes

[Source: Added by section 5 of the Act of October 15, **1980** (Pub. L. 96–-456; 94 Stat. 2026), effective October 15, 1980]

§ 6. Procedure for cases involving classified information

Codified to 18A U.S.C. § 6 | notes

[Source: Added by section 6 of the Act of October 15, **1980** (Pub. L. 96–-456; 94 Stat. 2026), effective October 15, 1980]

§ 7. Interlocutory appeal

Codified to 18A U.S.C. § 7 | notes

[Source: Added by section 7 of the Act of October 15, **1980** (Pub. L. 96–-456; 94 Stat. 2028), effective October 15, 1980]

§ 8. Introduction of classified information

Codified to 18A U.S.C. § 8 | notes

[Source: Added by section 8 of the Act of October 15, **1980** (Pub. L. 96–-456; 94 Stat. 2028), effective October 15, 1980]

§ 9. Security procedures

Codified to 18A U.S.C. § 9 | notes

[Source: Added by section 9 of the Act of October 15, **1980** (Pub. L. 96–-456; 94 Stat. 2029), effective October 15, 1980; as amended by section 1071(f) of title I of the Act of December 17, **2004** (Pub. L. 108–-458, 118 Stat. 3691), effective April 21, 2005]

§ 9A. Coordination requirements relating to the prosecution of cases involving classified information

Codified to 18A U.S.C. § 9A | notes

[Source: Added by section 607 of title VI of the Act of December 27, **2000** (Pub. L. 106–-567, 114 Stat. 2855), effective December 27, 2000; as amended by section 506(a)(8) of title V of the Act of March 9, **2006** (Pub. L. 109–-177, 120 Stat. 248), effective March 9, 2006]

§ 10. Identification of information related to the national defense

Codified to 18A U.S.C. § 10 | notes

[Source: Added by section 10 of the Act of October 15, **1980** (Pub. L. 96–-456; 94 Stat. 2029), effective October 15, 1980]

§ 11. Amendments to the Act

Codified to 18A U.S.C. § 11 | notes

[Source: Added by section 11 of the Act of October 15, **1980** (Pub. L. 96–-456; 94 Stat. 2029), effective October 15, 1980]

§ 12. Attorney General guidelines

Codified to 18A U.S.C. § 12 | notes

[Source: Added by section 12 of the Act of October 15, **1980** (Pub. L. 96–-456; 94 Stat. 2029), effective October 15, 1980]

§ 13. Reports to Congress

Codified to 18A U.S.C. § 13 | notes

[Source: Added by section 13 of the Act of October 15, **1980** (Pub. L. 96–-456; 94 Stat. 2030), effective October 15, 1980; as amended by section 811(b)(3) of title VIII of the Act of November 27, **2002** (Pub. L. 107–-306, 116 Stat. 2423), effective November 27, 2002]

§ 14. Functions of Attorney General may be exercised by Deputy Attorney General, the Associate Attorney General, or a designated Assistant Attorney General

Codified to 18A U.S.C. § 14 | notes

[Source: Added by section 14 of the Act of October 15, **1980** (Pub. L. 96–-456; 94 Stat. 2030), effective October 15, 1980; as amended by section 7020(g) of title VII of the Act of November 18, **1988** (Pub. L. 100–-690, 102 Stat. 4396), effective November 18, 1988]

§ 15. Effective date

Codified to 18A U.S.C. § 15 | notes

[Source: Added by section 15 of the Act of October 15, **1980** (Pub. L. 96–-456; 94 Stat. 2030), effective October 15, 1980]

§ 16. Short title - this Act may be cited as the "Classified Information Procedures Act".

Codified to 18A U.S.C. § 16 | notes

[Source: Added by section 16 of the Act of October 15, **1980** (Pub. L. 96–-456; 94 Stat. 2031), effective October 15, 1980]

The summary history of CIPA's codification through legislation:

- Enacted by Public Law 96-456, Oct. 15, 1980, (94 Stat. 2025),
- as amended by Public Law 100-690, Title VII, § 7020(g), Nov. 18, 1988, (102 Stat. 4396);
- as added by Public Law 106-567, Title VI, § 607, Dec. 27, 2000, (114 Stat. 2855);
- as amended by Public Law 107-306, Title VIII, § 811(b)(3), Nov. 27, 2002, (116 Stat. 2423);
- as amended by Public Law 108-458, Title I, § 1071(f), Dec. 17, 2004, (118 Stat. 3691);
- as amended by Public Law 109-177, Title V, § 506(a)(8), Mar. 9, 2006, (120 Stat. 248).

== Applicable executive orders ==
- Executive Order 12356, Apr. 06, 1982, 47 F.R. 14874, was rescinded by
- Executive Order 12958, Apr. 17, 1995, 60 FR 19825, was rescinded after amended by

- Executive Order 12972, Sept. 18, 1995, 60 FR 48863,
- Executive Order 13142, Nov. 19, 1999, 64 FR 66089,

- Executive Order 13292, Mar. 25, 2003, 68 FR 15315, was rescinded by
- Executive Order 13526, Dec. 29, 2009, 75 FR 707 (current)

== Purpose ==
The primary purpose of CIPA was to limit the practice of graymail by criminal defendants in possession of sensitive government secrets. "Graymail" refers to the threat by a criminal defendant to disclose classified information during the course of a trial. The graymailing defendant essentially presented the government with a "dilemma": either allow disclosure of the classified information or dismiss the indictment.

The procedural protections of CIPA protect unnecessary disclosure of classified information.

CIPA was not intended to infringe on a defendant's right to a fair trial or to change the existing rules of evidence in criminal procedure, and largely codified the power of district courts to come to pragmatic accommodations of the government's secrecy interests with the traditional right of public access to criminal proceedings. Courts, therefore, did not radically alter their practices with the passage of CIPA; instead, the Act simply made it clear that the measures courts already were taking under their inherent case-management powers were permissible.

CIPA, by its terms, covers only criminal cases. CIPA only applies when classified information is involved, as defined in the Act's Section 1.

== See also ==
- Thomas Andrews Drake (Espionage Act of 1917 case involving CIPA arguments)
- Federal Tort Claims Act
- Joseph Nacchio—Case involving CIPA arguments
- Silent witness rule—Evolved from the CIPA in the late 1900s/early 2000s
- State Secrets Protection Act
- Venona project—Problems with using decrypted Soviet messages as evidence at court
