= Operation Anaconda =

2002 military offensive against al-Qaeda and the Taliban during the war in Afghanistan

- Part of the War in Afghanistan
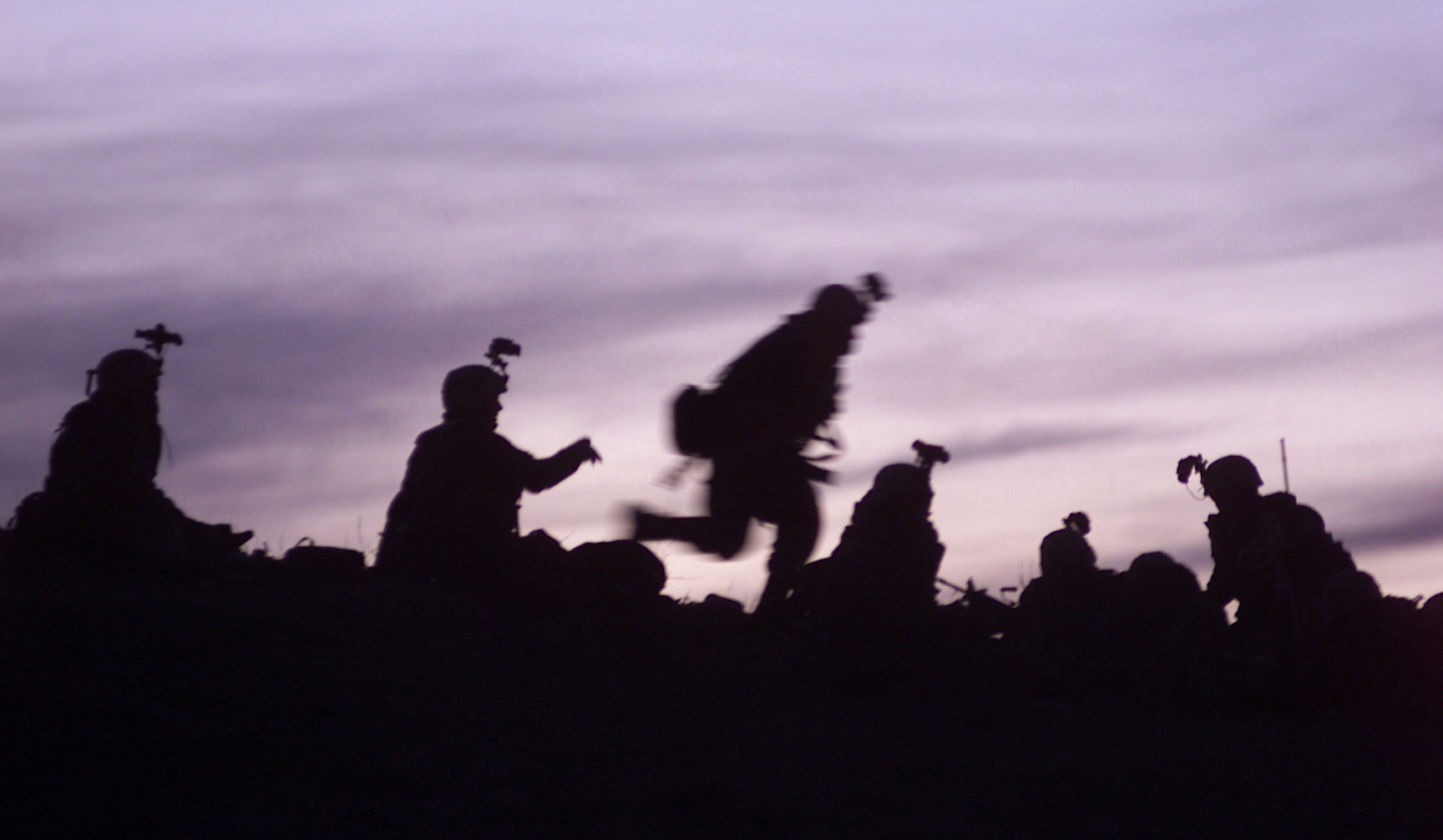
- U.S. soldiers from the 10th Mountain Division (Light Infantry) prepare to dig into fighting positions during Operation Anaconda in March 2002.
| Date | 2–18 March 2002 |
| Location | Shah-i-Kot Valley, Paktia Province, Afghanistan |
| Result | Coalition victory |

Belligerents
| Coalition: United States; Australia; Afghanistan; United Kingdom; Canada; Germany; France; Norway; Netherlands; Denmark; New Zealand | Taliban al-Qaeda; Islamic Movement of Uzbekistan |

Commanders and leaders
| Franklin L. Hagenbeck; Frank Wiercinski; Rowan Tink; Zia Lodin | Saif-ur-Rehman Mansoor; Tohir Yo'ldosh |

Strength
| 3,000 troops | 1,000 insurgents |

Casualties and losses
| 7 killed 8 killed (7 in the Battle of Takur Ghar); 82 wounded 2 MH-47 Chinook lost in the Battle of Takur Ghar | 500+ killed United States claimed: 800 killed |

Operation Anaconda or the Battle of Shah-i-Kot was a military operation that took place in early March 2002 as part of the war in Afghanistan. CIA paramilitary officers, working with their allies, attempted to destroy al-Qaeda and Taliban forces. The operation took place in the Shah-i-Kot Valley and Arma Mountains southeast of Zormat. This operation was the first large-scale battle in the post-2001 war in Afghanistan since the Battle of Tora Bora in December 2001. This was the first operation in the Afghanistan theater to involve a large number of U.S. forces participating in direct combat activities.

Between 2 and 18 March 2002, 1,700 airlifted U.S. troops and 1,000 pro-government Afghan militia battled between 300 and 1,000 al-Qaeda and Taliban fighters to obtain control of the valley. The Taliban and al-Qaeda forces fired mortars and heavy machine guns from entrenched positions in the caves and ridges of the mountainous terrain at U.S. forces attempting to secure the area. Afghan Taliban commander Maulavi Saif-ur-Rehman Mansoor later led Taliban reinforcements to join the battle. U.S. forces had estimated the strength of the rebels in the Shah-i-Kot Valley at 200 to 250, but later information suggested the actual strength was of 500 to 1,000 fighters.

The operation was delayed with two days due to bad weather forecasts.

== Background ==
On 11 September 2001, a group of Islamic terrorists attacked the United States. They were led by Osama bin Laden, who was the leader of a group called Al-Qaeda. It was suspected that bin Laden was hiding in Afghanistan, under the protection of the Taliban.

To respond to this threat, the United States launched Operation Enduring Freedom on 7 October 2001. The goal was to remove the Taliban from power and eliminate al-Qaeda. To achieve this, the US worked together with a rebel group in Afghanistan known as the Northern Alliance. The Northern Alliance was made up of people from different ethnic backgrounds, such as Tajiks, Uzbeks, and Hazaras, who opposed the Taliban, which was primarily led by ethnic Pashtuns.

The US used a combination of airstrikes and special ground forces to help the Northern Alliance in its fight against the Taliban. They were able to quickly capture Taliban strongholds, and on 13 November 2001, they successfully took control of the capital city, Kabul.

Around the same time, intelligence suggested that Osama bin Laden and the Al-Qaeda leaders had taken refuge in a training camp located in the Tora Bora mountains near Jalalabad, Nangarhar Province in Eastern Afghanistan. Unlike previous battle areas in Northern Afghanistan, this region was mainly inhabited by Pashtuns.

The United States wanted the Northern Alliance to help them attack Al-Qaeda in Tora Bora, but the Tajik and Uzbek warlords of the Northern Alliance refused. They were not willing to enter the hostile Pashtun areas in the east or south. So, the United States had to find other allies for the assault.

They managed to bribe Pashtun militias in the areas to join forces with them, and called this group the "Eastern Alliance." Together, they launched an attack on the Al-Qaeda training camp in Tora Bora on 30 November 2001. However, these Eastern Alliance militias proved to be far less effective than the Northern Alliance had been. They did not have the same level of animosity towards Al-Qaeda and would leave the battlefield each night to break their Ramadan fast. Due to the lack of effective cooperation with the Eastern Alliance militias, Osama bin Laden and the Al-Qaeda leaders escaped from the Battle of Tora Bora.

After the Tora Bora operation, there was a perception that the reason Osama bin Laden escaped was because there were no US forces in place to stop Al-Qaeda from fleeing into Pakistan. The commanders on the ground had asked for 800 United States Army Rangers to be sent to block these escape routes, but CENTCOM, the military authorities, declined their request. This perceived failure to deploy blocking forces would have a significant impact on the planning of Operation Anaconda.

Around mid-January 2002, US officials received intelligence reports indicating that enemy forces, including Al-Qaeda, were gathering in the Shah-i-kot valley in Paktia Province, which was located about 60 miles south of Gardez. The Lower Shah-i-kot region was close to the Pakistani tribal lands, where many Al-Qaeda fighters were thought to have fled after the Tora Bora operation. As January progressed, US military officials started considering a potential attack on the Shah-i-kot valley.

The Shah-i-kot Valley, meaning 'the Place of the King' in Pashto, is about 9 kilometers long and 5 kilometers wide at its widest point. It consists of two main areas, the Lower Shah-i-kot and the Upper Shah-i-kot, running roughly parallel to each other. In the lower Shah-i-kot, there are several imposing mountains, with Takur Ghar being the most prominent at the southeastern end, and Tsapare Ghar to the northeast, which controls the northern entrance to the valley.

The valley is quite defendable, as its high ridges offer natural caves, crevasses, and other protected spots where guerrilla fighters can position themselves to shoot at the valley floor and access routes. During the Soviet-Afghan War, this area was also a battleground, as the Soviets fought mujahideen guerillas. The mujahideen, who opposed the Red Army in southeast Afghanistan, strategically positioned their defenses in Paktia province, mainly along the central mountain range. One critical highway between Gardez and Khost was a major supply route for the Soviet forces stationed in Khost. However, in 1981, the Afghan fighters successfully blocked this road and laid siege to Khost, forcing the Soviets to rely on airlift for resupply. The siege continued for seven years, and eventually, the Soviets were forced to retreat from the area.

During the Soviet–Afghan War, Mujahideen leader Malawi Nasrullah Mansoor was in charge of the valley and invited foreign jihadists to base themselves in the Lower Shah-i-kot. Mansoor fortified the valley, digging trench systems, building bunkers and firing positions into the ridgelines, many of which would be put into effect during the operation. Malawi Nasrullah Mansoor later joined the Taliban, becoming governor of Paktia Province before being killed in a battle with a rival warlord. Using his family's connections in the region Nasrullah Mansoor's son, Saif-ur-Rehman Mansoor, became the leading Taliban commander of Zurmat District in Paktia Province by 2002. The mujahideen fighters had successfully defeated the Soviet Army twice in this valley, and the Taliban-Al-Qaeda coalition expected events here to pan out in a similar fashion.

Increasing signals and human intelligence indicated a strong presence of Taliban, IMU and al-Qaeda fighters in the Shah-i-Kot Valley; approximately 200 to 250 fighters were believed to be wintering and possibly preparing for a spring offensive in the valley. The signal intelligence also raised the possibility that high-value targets (HVTs) were present in the valley among which were not only Saif Rehman, but also Tohir Yuldeshev, co-founder of the terrorist organization Islamic Movement of Uzbekistan, and Jalaluddin Haqqani, whose tribal network controlled the area.

Jalaluddin Haqqani had a history of fighting against the Soviets with support from the CIA and Pakistan's intelligence agency, ISI. He was once seen as a potential alternative leader among the Pashtuns, apart from the Taliban. The CIA linked the Haqqani family to Osama bin Laden's escape from Tora Bora, an allegation that the family strongly denied. As a result, the Haqqani family became a target for American airstrikes, leading most of its members to flee across the border into Pakistan. However, despite their departure, Al-Qaeda fighters who had sought shelter in the family's tribal lands remained in the Shah-i-kot Valley.

In late January and February, a plan was developed to attack the Shah-i-kot Valley. The operation involved Afghan military forces (AMF) supported and guided by US special operators. Major General Franklin L. Hagenbeck, Commander of the 10th Mountain Division, was assigned to lead the Combined Joint Task Force Mountain responsible for the operation. The strategy was to have Afghan Pashtun militias launch an attack on the valley, similar to what had happened at Tora Bora. But this time, US special forces would be positioned in the eastern mountains to block any potential escape routes into Pakistan. The expectation was that Al-Qaeda and Taliban fighters would retreat in the face of the Afghan militias' assault, and the US forces would be able to capture them as they fled.

The US decided to place its trust in a Pashtun warlord named Zia Lodin to lead the Afghan tribal forces. The operation officer of Task Force Dagger, Mark Rosengard, explained why they chose to rely on the Afghan militias that had previously disappointed them during the Battle of Tora Bora. First, there were reports suggesting that the Al-Qaeda forces in Shah-i-kot Valley were mixed among 1000 Afghan civilians. In such a situation, it was crucial to have troops who could distinguish between local civilians and jihadist foreign fighters. There was concern about accidentally killing civilians and repeating the Soviet forces' mistakes, which led to the Afghans viewing them as occupiers. Another reason was to foster a sense of "ownership" among the Afghans over the victory. Rosengard wanted the local people to feel like they were the ones who had driven out the foreign Al-Qaeda fighters from their country. When asked whether such a concept could be embraced on a national level in a country as ethnically diverse as Afghanistan, Mark Rosengard responded that at least Zia Lodin seemed to grasp the idea.

An important element in the operation was a group called Advanced Force Operations (AFO), reporting to Task Force 11 (TF 11). Their role was to carry out risky reconnaissance missions deep within enemy territory. AFO was not a fixed organization; it was a concept coordinated by a special operations headquarters cell that could draw personnel from various special operations units based on the mission's needs. Pete Blaber was chosen to lead AFO's efforts in Afghanistan. It was decided to use U.S. conventional infantry. The forces used, consisting of the 187th Infantry Regiment ("Rakkasans") of the 101st Airborne Division, led by Colonel Frank Wiercinski, and soldiers of 1st Battalion, 87th Infantry Regiment, 10th Mountain Division, led by Lieutenant Colonel Paul LaCamera, were to be inserted by CH-47D Chinooks, supported by six AH-64A Apache helicopters and secure these blocking positions. In keeping with established strategy in Afghanistan, fire support was to be provided by United States Air Force units, rather than artillery. Further air support was provided by U.S. Navy units and French Air Force Mirage 2000Ds. The amount of conventional assets allowed in Afghanistan was limited by United States Central Command (CENTCOM) and civilian defense leadership. The final plan foresaw two major forces: TF Hammer and TF Anvil. TF Hammer consisted of Afghan militias and a small number of US special operators as the primary effort to assault the Shah-i-Kot Valley; their objective was to enter the valley from the north, assaulting through the villages of Serkhankheyl and Marzak, where intelligence indicated that the enemy was concentrated, and channel fleeing enemy into the TF Anvil, the Rakkasan blocking positions. TF Anvil consisted of TF Rakkasan and the 1–87 to set up blocking positions and prevent enemy forces from escaping.

== Units involved ==
The operation was composed of:

- Task Force Dagger: ODAs from the 5th SFG, B company, 2nd Battalion, 160th SOAR and USAF Combat Controllers.
- Task Force Rakkasan: 3rd Brigade, 101st Airborne Division, 1st and 2nd battalion 187th Infantry Regiment, 1st Battalion, 87th Infantry Regiment, 10th Mountain Division.
- Task Force Commando: 2nd Brigade, 10th Mountain Division, 4th Battalion, 31st Infantry Regiment 3rd Battalion, Princess Patricia's Canadian Light Infantry.
- Task Force 64: 1 Squadron, Australian Special Air Service Regiment.
- Task Force K-Bar: ODAs from the 3rd SFG.
- Task Force Bowie: AFO (made up of a 45-man reconnaissance unit Delta Force and augmented by selected DEVGRU operators recce specialists, combat controllers and supported by ISA's technical experts, AFO conducted covert reconnaissance usually sending small 2 or 3 man teams on foot or on ATVs, deploying observation posts to watch and report enemy movements and numbers as well as environmental reconnaissance).
- Task Force Sword/11: Mako 30, 31 and 21, Task Force Blue/DEVGRU.

SOF teams from Task Force K-Bar and Task Force 64 included:

- Navy SEALs from SEAL Teams 2, 3 and 8
- Green Berets from 3rd SFG
- The Canadian Army's Joint Task Force 2 (JTF2)
- The German Army's Kommando Spezialkräfte (KSK)
- The Norwegian special forces units Forsvarets Spesialkommando (FSK) and Marinejegerkommandoen (MJK)
- Elements of the Australian Special Air Service Regiment
- Elements of the New Zealand Special Air Service
- Dutch Korps Commandotroepen
- Danish special forces from Jægerkorpset

These teams inserted into the outer edges of the valley to cut off any escape.

Other units that took part are the B Co. 159th Avn Rgt, 75th Ranger Regiment, Joint Special Operations Command, the CIA's Special Activities Division, and the British Royal Marines.

The Afghan militia forces were made up of three Pashtun units. The first unit, led by commander Zia Lodin, had around 600 men. They were planned to use as the main force and given the name TF Hammer for the operation. They received advice and training from ODAs 594 and 372. The other Afghan units were led by Zakim Khan and Kamel Khan, each comprising about 400 to 500 fighters. Zakim's units partnered with ODAs 542 and 381, while Kamel's units worked with ODAs 571 and 392. These two forces were designated as TF Anvil.

== Prelude ==
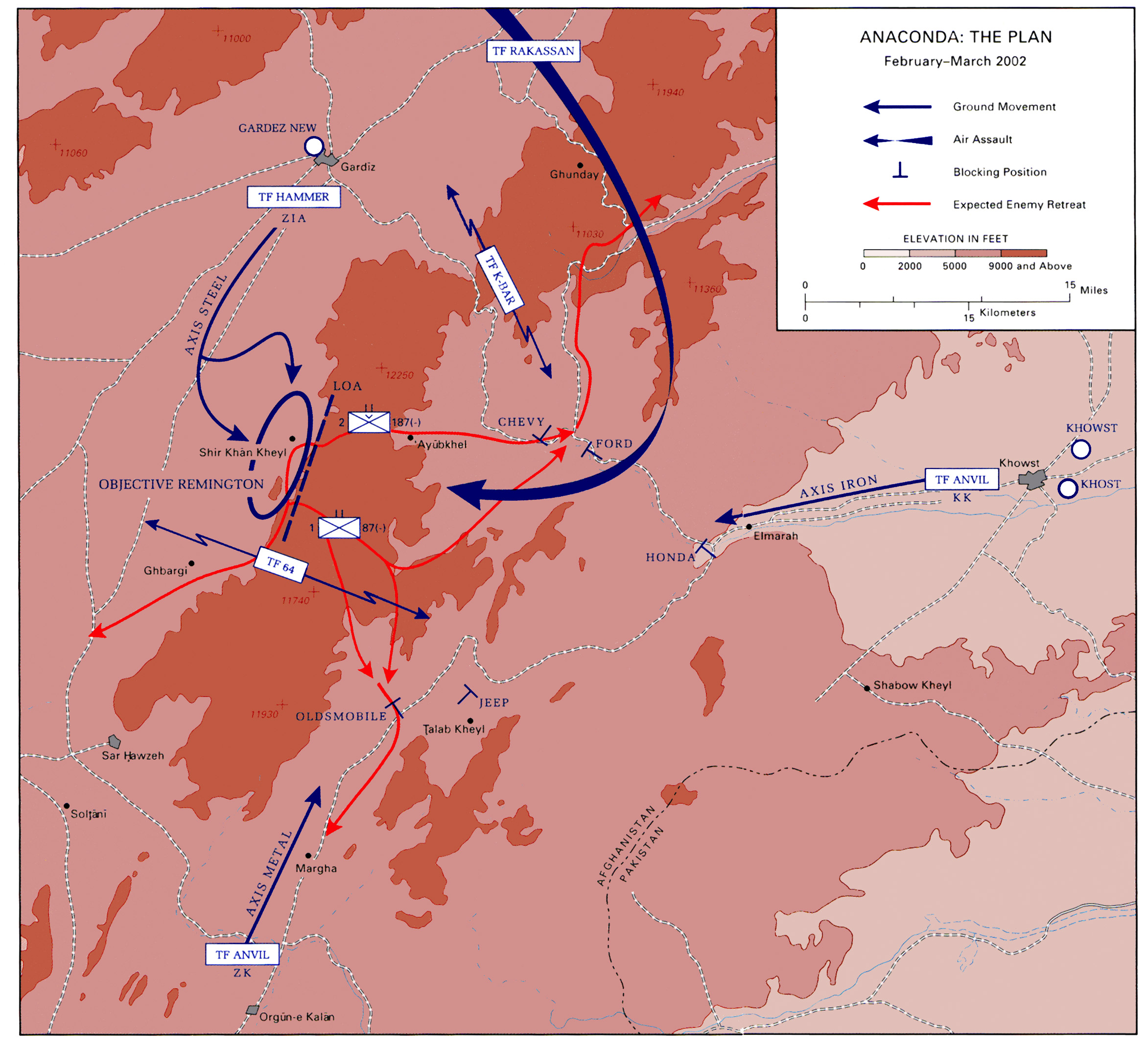
A map illustrating the plan for Operation Anaconda

During the planning phase of the operation, Advanced Force Operations (AFO) units carried out reconnaissance to gather intelligence about the Taliban and Al-Qaeda positions in Shah-i-Kot. Efforts to access U.S. intelligence databases had provided no useful information. Even extensive satellite imagery of the Shah-i-Kot area did not reveal much because the Al-Qaeda forces there were too lightly equipped and too adept at camouflage to stand out, unlike the easily recognizable Iraqi tank brigades in the First Gulf War.

Intelligence operatives realized that they would have to rely mainly on human intelligence gathering (HUMINT) and intercepted signals (SIGINT) to gather insights about the situation in the valley. The commander of Delta Force, lieutenant colonel Pete Blaber ruled out any helicopter infiltration of AFOs into the area as not to alert the terrorists in the valley; in addition to AFOs conducting reconnaissance of routes into and around the valley on modified Polaris ATVs (often in adverse weather conditions on difficult terrain), two teams (codenamed India and Juliet) with 3 and 5 operators (respectively) of highly experienced Delta operators from their squadrons Reconnaissance and Surveillance Troop and elite Air Force combat controllers from the 24th STS climbed high into the mountains and gorges of the Shah-i-Kot, often in extreme weather conditions, to conduct environmental reconnaissance. Their vital intelligence was fed back to the AFO and would prove invaluable once the operation started. On 28 February, three AFO teams were covertly infiltrated into the valley, one codenamed Juliet was made up of 5 Delta operators, a combat controller, and a signals intelligence specialist from the ISA, entered the valley on ATVs from the north, driving through the night in adverse weather conditions, eventually reaching a covert hide on the eastern side of the valley. Another team codenamed India, composed of three Delta operators, a combat controller, and an attached ISA operator walked into the valley through the same conditions to hide in the southwest of the valley, known as the "Fish Hook". The final team was known as Mako 31 and was composed of three SEALs from DEVGRUs Red Team, a USAF Combat Controller, and a US Navy EOD operator. They infiltrated the area on foot via the southern edge of the valley to set up an observation post on a terrain feature known as 'The Finger.' All three teams were tasked with confirming enemy strengths and dispositions including antiaircraft emplacements, ensuring the designated Rakkasan helicopter landing zones were clear of obstructions, and providing terminal guidance for air support both prior to and during the insertion of conventional forces. SOF teams from Task Force K-Bar and Task Force 64 were also inserted into the valley to establish observation posts which according to US planners "had to be tenable, afford good reconnaissance, and cover the identified escape routes or 'rat lines' into Pakistan"

After reading the daily reports from the AFO team, general Tommy Franks became convinced that a major operation was necessary to deal with what appeared to be a significant enemy presence in the Shah-i-Kot Valley. The military authorities finalized their plan for the attack on the valley. Task Force Rakkasan were to air assault into the valley using CH-47D Chinook transport helicopters, supported by six AH-64A Apache attack helicopters. Their role was to occupy several blocking positions along the eastern ridgeline of Shah-i-Kot. Task Force Hammer, led by Commander Zia Lodin with 500 Afghan Pashtun units, would enter the valley through the northern entrance in a ground assault convoy. Before their ground assault, a planned aerial bombardment would target known enemy positions. As Task Force Hammer moved through the villages of Serkhankheyl and Marzak, where enemy forces were believed to be concentrated, the Task Force Rakkasan soldiers manning the blocking positions would be ready to engage any fleeing enemy forces. Additionally, two Afghan militias were assigned to create an outer cordon to prevent any Al-Qaeda or IMU stragglers from escaping into Pakistan. The operation was originally scheduled to be launched 28 February, but was delayed until 2 March due to a severe snowstorm.

== Battle ==
=== 1 March 2002 ===
A day before the planned operation, two Mako 31 snipers found a group of foreign fighters that had established a position and were manning a DShK HMG on the peak where they planned to set up an observation post. The DShK overlooked the southeastern entrance to the valley through which the TF Rakkasan Chinooks were due to fly in 24 hours and, if it was not disabled before then, it could shoot down the Chinooks carrying the conventional forces. The SEALs came up with a plan to ambush the enemy in the pre-dawn darkness before the Rakkasans flew into the valley. At 4 A.M the next morning, the three SEALs from MAKO 31 quietly approached the enemy camp, intending to wait until shortly before the air assault was scheduled to begin before eliminating the fighters there. However, the SEALs were spotted by an Uzbek IMU insurgent and a brief firefight ensued. During the intense exchange, two of the SEALs' rifles jammed after firing just one shot. The third SEAL held off the enemy as his colleagues quickly cleared the jams and resumed firing, killing 5 out of the 7 foreign fighters. As another insurgent joined the firefight, firing a PKM, the SEAL team decided to break contact and called in an AC-130 which destroyed the enemy encampment with 105 mm rounds. The sound of the AC-130 firing alerted the Al-Qaeda fighters throughout the valley, who began firing their weapons into the air. However, this turned out to be a fatal mistake as the tracer rounds revealed their positions to the AFO teams, who noted the locations to be targeted by airstrikes later.

The SEALs proceeded to occupy the observation post. Upon searching the camp, they discovered that the Al-Qaeda fighters were well-equipped. Not only did the SEALs find plenty of ammunition for the DShK, but also a Soviet-style SVD Dragunov sniper rifle, several Kalashnikov assault rifles, at least one RPG-7 launcher with several rounds, a PK machine gun, and several fragmentation grenades. The SEALs also found documents that were written in both Arabic and Cyrillic scripts, indicating that the Arab Al-Qaeda fighters and the Uzbek and Chechen IMU fighters were not operating separately, but had formed cross-cultural teams. Among the documents was a notebook containing instructions on how to construct homemade bombs for blowing up bridges, buildings, buses, and cars.

=== 2 March 2002 ===
Canadian and U.S. sniper teams and Afghan forces began to sweep the Shah-i-Kot valley area to root out rebel forces regrouping in the valley after the fall of the Taliban regime.

==== TF Hammer/TF Anvil ====
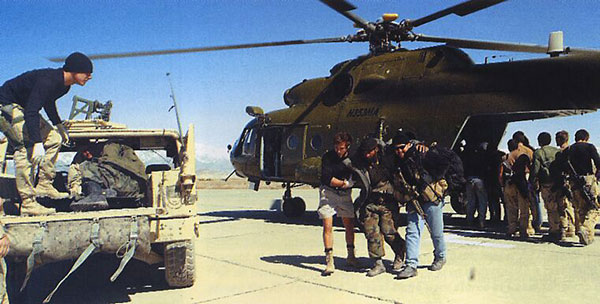
U.S. special forces help Afghan troops away from a CIA-operated Mil Mi-17 Hip helicopter at Bagram Airbase

Around midnight, the units of TF Hammer loaded into their vehicles and left their base in Gardez at 33°35′58″N 69°13′44″E for the Shah-i-Kot Valley in a convoy of 39 trucks, buses, and other vehicles. TF Hammer consisted of a large force of Afghan militia led by Zia Lodin and the Special Forces A-teams Texas 14/ODA 594 and Cobra 72/ODA 372. The road conditions were terrible due to a recent snowstorm that had turned the dirt roads into muddy and slippery terrain. This made progress challenging, especially in the difficult terrain.

As they moved, some trucks got stuck, and there was even an accident where a large bus turned over, injuring several fighters. The commanders ordered the trucks to use their headlights, destroying any element of surprise. As TF Hammer continued, it suffered from a lack of unit cohesion because of the transportation difficulties. A convoy led by Army Chief Warrant Officer Stanley L. Harriman of the Third Special Forces Group split off from the main TF Hammer force to reach the assigned observation point. Grim 31, an AC-130 aircraft providing fire support and reconnaissance for the assault, spotted Harriman's convoy and, due to a failure in its inertial navigation system, believed it was in a position away from friendly forces (this was due to a problem with the "glint" panels which should have identified the convoy as American.) Grim 31 engaged the column, resulting in the friendly fire death of Harriman and the wounding of several Afghan militias and U.S. special forces.

The main body of TF Hammer reached its pre-assault point around 06:15 and waited for the expected "55 minute" aerial bombardment of enemy positions. Miscommunication between Texas 14 and higher command meant the bombardment was not that extensive and consisted of six bombs. This was due to a bomb getting stuck in the launch bay of the B-1B that was on its bomb run. The next aircraft in line waited for the B-1B to receive permission to jettison the bomb and go round again. During this time, both bombers plus the additional two F-15Es claimed to have received a "knock off" call directing them to cease the bombardment. One of the F-15E pilots later acknowledged that this may have been a communication directing Grim-31 to cease fire. This lack of air support demoralized the Afghans and frustrated the special forces. The Afghan fighters, in trucks, were devastated by mortar fire registered in advance to strike fixed points on the road. The Afghans suffered forty or more deaths and injuries.

At this point, it became clear that the Al Qaeda fighters had been expecting an attack. The intense small arms and mortar fire, combined with the absence of close air support, caused the Afghan forces of TF Hammer to scatter and refuse to advance any further. This situation was reminiscent of the challenges faced during the earlier Tora Bora operation, in which the Afghan militias had similarly refused to advance in the face of enemy resistance. With no opportunity to alter the operation that had already been set in motion, the task of assaulting the Shah-i-Kot Valley had to be carried out by the troops of TF Anvil instead.

==== TF Rakkasan ====
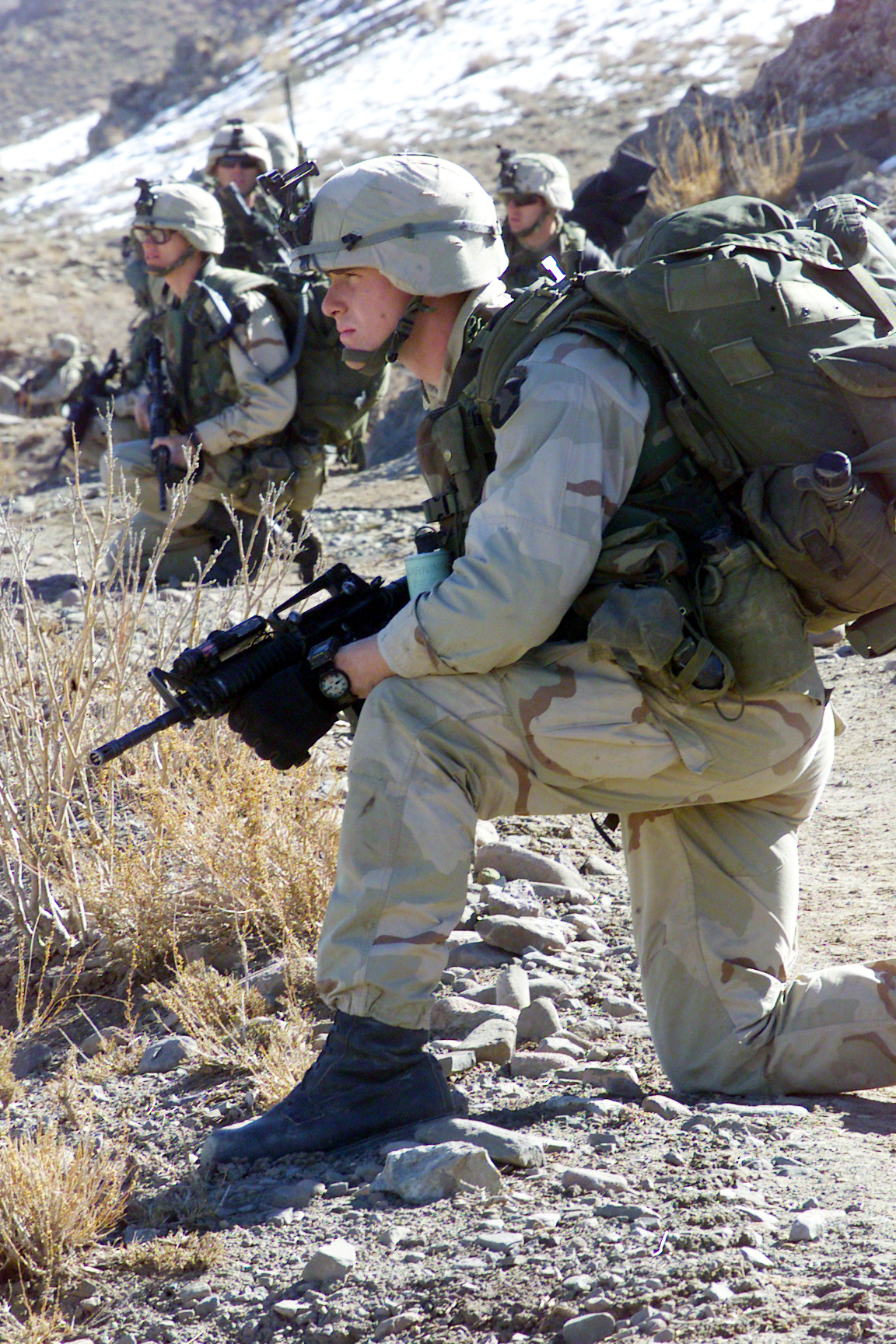
A U.S. soldier with 1st Battalion, 187th Infantry Regiment, 101st Airborne Division (Air Assault), watches for enemy movement during a pause in a road march during Operation Anaconda, March 2002.

At 05:00, the assault troops of TF Rakkasan boarded their CH-47 Chinook transport helicopters at Bagram Air Base and flew south towards the Shah-i-Kot Valley. The weather was cold and cloudy, and the soldiers bundled up in cold weather gear to keep warm. The six Chinooks carrying the Rakkasans were accompanied by two UH-60 Blackhawk helicopters and several AH-64 Apaches. The aircraft ran into significant troubles during the flight caused by foggy weather, and somehow the Chinooks passed the valley entrance significantly ahead of the Apaches, forcing the Rakkasans to drop off on "hot" landing zones (meaning that the insurgents were nearby and able to engage them immediately as they dropped off). The six Chinooks spread out and headed for their respective landing zones. As the security team rushed to secure the landing zones, the TF Rakkasan commander observed the valley with concern. He noticed that there were no signs of civilians in the towns below. No colors, no smoke, no animals, no hanging clothes – nothing to indicate people living there. It became clear that the civilians had been moved out and that there were only enemy combatants to be found there.

At 06:30 the first wave of Rakkasans and Mountain troops landed via Chinook helicopter along the eastern and northern edges of the valley to await the fleeing fighters at their assigned blocking positions. The terrorists appeared surprised and did not fire on the Chinooks at first, possibly due to them being distracted by TF Hammer's advance or because of ineffective communication between the foreign fighters themselves. This confusion bought the infantry invaluable time to take up security positions around the helicopter landing zone, and the first shots rang out as the Chinooks lifted off and departed. Due to TF Hammer having aborted the mission, they came under much heavier fire than they had anticipated after landing on their objectives and remained pinned down by heavy mortar fire and found themselves locked in a fierce firefight throughout the day. Orbiting Apache helicopters attempted to suppress enemy mortar teams, but ran into a wall of RPG and 12.7mm fire, with one Apache losing all of its electronics to an RPG hit. Instead of 200-250 fighters in the valley, as originally expected, post-assessment held that the area contained 750 to 1,000 terrorists dug in on the high ground around the valley. The insurgents used their ZPU-1 antiaircraft guns, DSHK, and small arms fire against the attack helicopters supporting the Rakkasans.

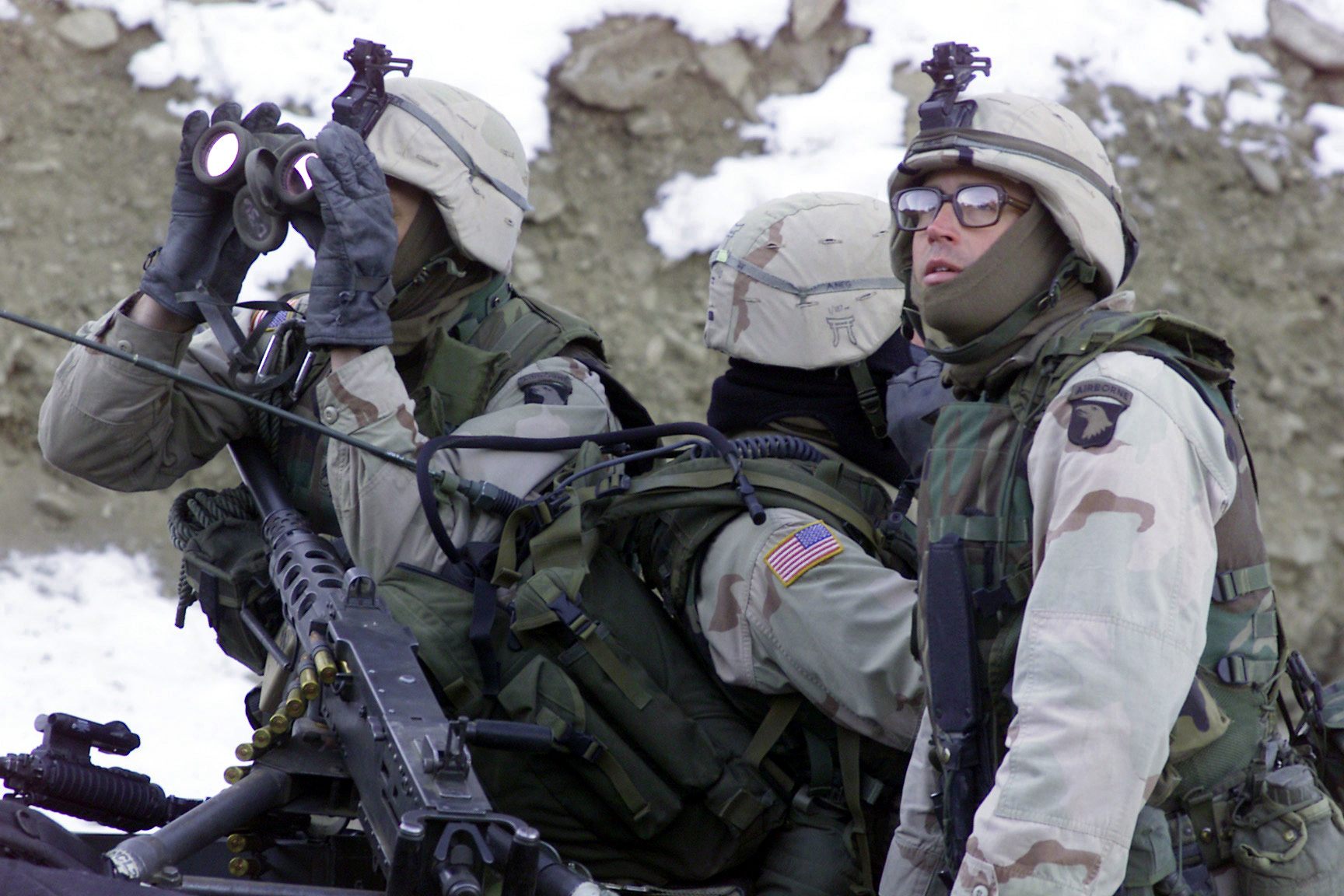
U.S. soldiers from the 1st Battalion, 187th Infantry Regiment, 101st Airborne Division (Air Assault), scan the ridgeline for enemy forces during Operation Anaconda, 4 March 2002.

The Al-Qaeda fighters employed a tactic they had learned from the Afghan mujahideen during the Soviet-Afghan war. They fired their RPG rockets into the air, aiming for the self-destruct mechanism that automatically detonates the warheads after traveling a specific distance (920 meters). The insurgents used this method to set the rounds to explode near the aircraft and damage its hydraulic and electrical innards with its lethal flak bursts of shrapnel. Furthermore, the terrorists launched RPG barrages just ahead of the Apaches, another old mujahideen tactic that made it challenging for the Apaches to navigate through the valley safely. Two Apaches were taken out of the fight and forced to return to base early on the first day due to the heavy RPG and machine-gun fire. Upon returning to base, the crew discovered more than 30 bullet holes in the fuselage of one of the helicopters, in addition to damage to its left side caused by an RPG. According to journalist Steve Call, due to the intense hostile reception, only two out of the planned eight CH-47s managed to land in their designated landing zones, although this is disputed as other sources contend that there were only six chinooks, and all of them successfully landed without incident.

Despite heavy opposition, Task Force Rakkasan managed to secure its blocking positions to the north by the middle of the morning. The presence of AFO teams in strategic high-ground locations played a crucial role in preventing the infantry from being overrun by the enemy. General Hagenbeck, who was in charge of the operation, was considering calling the mission off. However, Pete Blaber, the AFO commander, got on the radio and convinced him otherwise. Blaber insisted that this was a once-in-a-lifetime opportunity on the battlefield and that he intended to keep his teams in the Shah-i-Kot Valley, continuing to decimate the enemy through air strikes until they were no longer a threat. Throughout the day, TF Rakkasan soldiers fought relentlessly with the AFOs providing continuous support by calling in air strikes on Al-Qaeda positions. The Apaches also played a crucial role in protecting the Rakkasans on the valley floor during the intense battle. AFO's only frustration was that Rakkasan ETAC/JTAC had priority for calling in airstrikes over the AFOs requests and the other SOF reconnaissance teams in and around the valley.

The troops of the 1st Battalion, 87th Infantry Regiment in the southern landing zones faced the heaviest fighting. The men on the floor of the valley then picked up and began to patrol north again moving another 50 or so meters when an RPG was fired off a low foothill to the east. This round closed in on around 10 men, including the two Australians and most of the American leadership, landing in the snow and mud right amongst them but failing to detonate. The AQ then opened up with a DShK as the troops on the ground ran for the only cover on the valley floor in what became known as "Hell's Halfpipe." In this engagement, Staff Sergeant Andrzej Ropel, and Specialist William Geraci, recently transferred in from the Division's Long Range Surveillance Detachment, led the squad under fire to a ridgeline above the "Halfpipe." Ropel was able to kill the enemy observer calling mortar fire into the "Halfpipe," and he and his squad could now see the surrounding terrain. Ropel was later awarded the Bronze Star Medal with a Valor device for his actions. The expectation of very limited enemy indirect fire capability meant that only a single 120mm mortar was brought in the first wave. The primary fire support for the troops was provided by two McDonnell Douglas AH-64 Apaches of the 3rd Battalion, 101st Aviation Regiment, 159th Aviation Brigade ("Eagle Attack").

As the AFO scouts investigated the southern area near the base of Takur Ghar, the prominent mountain in the valley, they came across an unusual scene. Among the Al-Qaeda fighters, they spotted a female combatant, a rare occurrence not frequently seen among the Taliban and Al-Qaeda forces in Afghanistan. This woman, in her mid-thirties, stood out with her ponytailed hair, a long scarf that draped all the way down to her knees, and an AK-47 slung across her back. Despite being armed, she was not engaged in combat; instead, she sat on a ledge at the mountain's base, cooking. Other enemy fighters, who had been actively sniping at the US scouts, would come down to join her for meals before returning to their positions. As the scouts prepared to move on, they called for mortar support from the 187th Infantry's mortar platoon positioned in the "Halfpipe," obliterating the woman's position, along with the other Al-Qaeda fighters in the vicinity.

Signalman Martin "Jock" Wallace, of the Australian Special Air Service Regiment, was awarded the Medal for Gallantry for his actions during the fighting. When a mortar team from the 1-87 Infantry was hit by enemy mortar fire, Wallace put himself in harm's way, collecting some of the wounded by dragging them into the creek bed, then dressing their wounds along with another SASR liaison officer. Throughout the day, the TACP forward air controllers and Special Forces teams that had infiltrated into the area the previous day assisted in calling in airstrikes from B-1, B-52, F-15, F-18 and F-16 aircraft, inflicting heavy casualties on the Taliban and al Qaeda fighters, but by no means silencing them. After nearly having their position overrun, the men in the southern landing zones were in a desperate position, pinned down all day and short of ammunition. Salvation came after dark in the form of an AC-130U Spooky gunship that unlike the faster-moving jets during the day, was able to loiter over the area and provide sustained firepower so the men could be airlifted out under cover of darkness; the group suffered 35 wounded (two chalks of which were casevaced by PaveHawk CSAR choppers) and none killed.

=== 3 March and 4 March 2002 ===
==== Battle of Takur Ghar ====
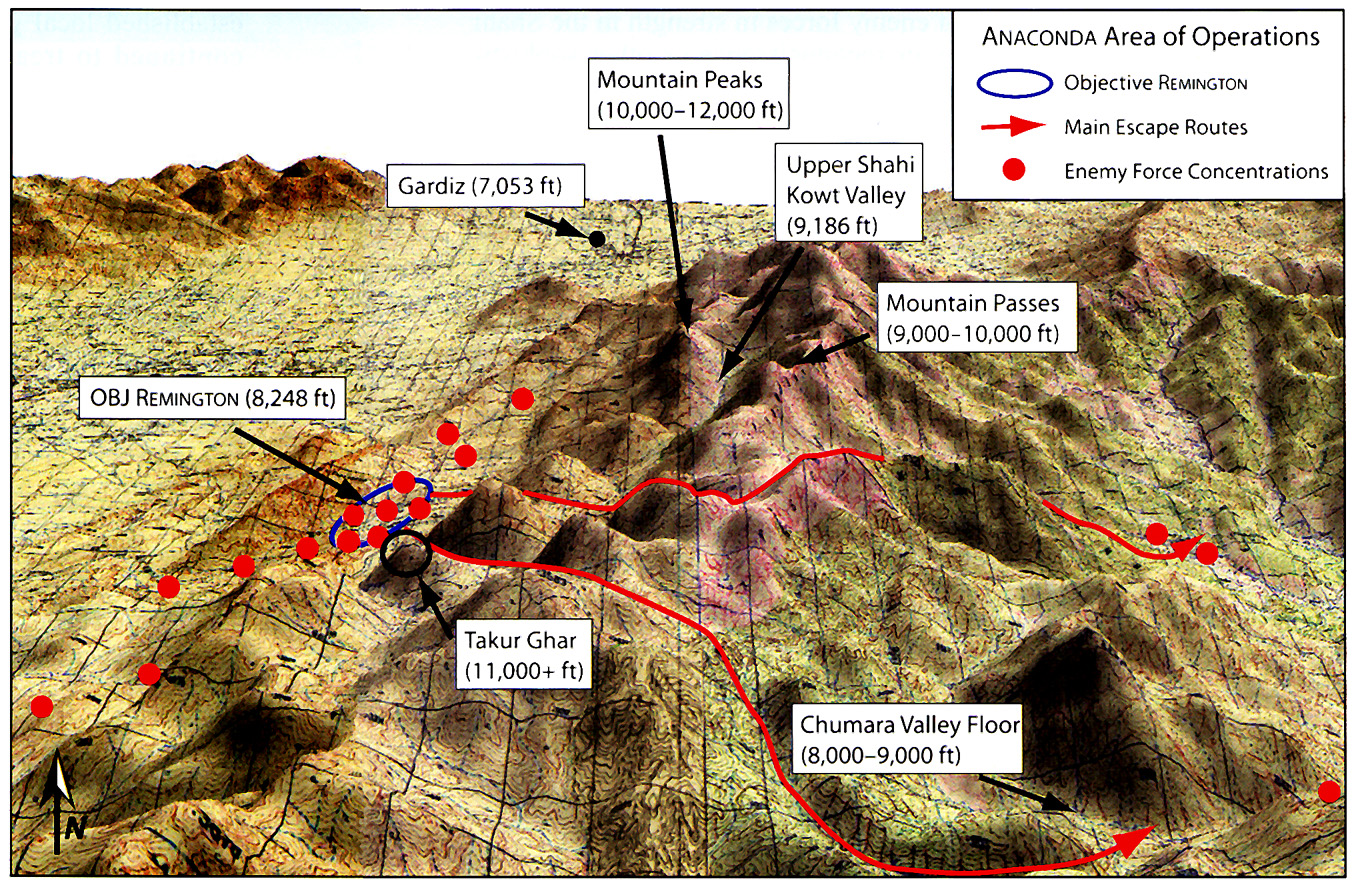
A strategic map of operations by U.S. forces in the Shah-i-Kot Valley during the operation

On the second day of the operation, General Hagenbeck and Colonel Wiercinski decided to make some changes. Because many soldiers in the southern blocking position of the 187th Infantry had been wounded, Hagenbeck chose to withdraw forces from the southern end of the valley. Instead, he relocated them to the northern position to assist the 3rd Brigade of the 101st Airborne Division in carrying out a sweep from the north to the south along the eastern ridge. Lieutenant Colonel Ron Corkran's 187th Infantry Battalion arrived in the northern region around 8:00 PM on 3 March and began their careful sweep southward, encountering no resistance. It became clear that the defenders had abandoned the valley floor. By the end of the day, they had successfully cleared a path to the base of Takur Ghar, and had gained a much better feel for the opposition, which had proven to be more formidable than initially anticipated.

General Hagenbeck also took steps to address the challenges the air assault team had faced on the initial day of the operation. The Apache helicopters had suffered significant damage, and it had become apparent that the AC-130 aircraft were susceptible to ground fire, making them unsuitable for daytime operations. Furthermore, there were not enough Air Force tactical controllers available to fulfill the demand for precision-guided strikes against al-Qaeda positions. To tackle these issues, CENTCOM deployed five A-10 Thunderbolt II aircraft. Not only were these robust aircraft far less susceptible to ground fire, but they could also remain over the battlefield during daylight hours and deliver accurate strikes without requiring the assistance of Air Force tactical controllers.

In the late evening of 3 March, Lieutenant Colonel Pete Blaber received notice from Brigadier General Gregory Trebon, commander of TF 11, that two SEAL fire teams commanded by Lieutenant Commander Vic Hyder were to be inserted into the Shah-i-Kot Valley. The two SEAL fire teams, Mako 30 and Mako 21, planned to establish an observation point on either end of the valley. One team would move to the peak of Takur Ghar, which commanded the southern approach to the Shah-i-Kot valley. Due to time constraints, a helicopter insertion would be needed for the teams to reach the peak before dawn. Hyder requested authorization to shift the insertion 24 hours to the next evening but was directed that insertion was critical to SOF providing support to the Operation. Originally, an insertion point 1,400 metres (1,500 yd) east of the peak was identified, but due to uncontrollable time constraints, the SEALs of Mako 30 were forced into an insertion to the peak itself. Even though all overhead imagery showed no signs of life on the peak of Takur Ghar, Lieutenant Commander Hyder gave the team final guidance per special operation procedure that if any signs were seen, the mission would be aborted.

The SEAL fire team, Mako 30, was picked up by an MH-47 Chinook helicopter, at 23:23 on 3 March. However, the Chinook experienced engine difficulties and new MH-47s were dispatched to replace the original helicopters. This delay meant that the SEALs could not be inserted into the landing zone east of the peak until 02:30 on 4 March, which did not allow enough time to reach the peak before daylight. Blaber was notified that the SEALs were forced to insert on the peak to fulfill the order to infil Mako 30 that night. Nail 22, an AC-130H Spectre, reconnoitered the peak, and, seeing no enemy activity, declared the mountaintop secure. It was then called away to support other troops before the Chinook arrived.

At approximately 03:00, the Chinook attempted to land atop the mountain. As they approached, the pilots and SEALs observed tracks in the snow and other signs of recent human activity. As they discussed a possible mission abort, the helicopter was met with effective RPG fire. Two Rocket Propelled Grenades slammed into the helicopter, shutting down one of its engines, the electric system, and the hydraulic systems. Petty Officer First Class Neil C. Roberts had fallen out of the open ramp as the pilot had taken evasive actions. They first attempted to return and retrieve him, but the engine damage prevented proper control and the helicopter was forced to crash-land in the valley below, approximately 4 miles away. The SEAL team Mako 30, regrouped and was ferried by nearby units to another Chinook to go back to Takur Ghar and search for Roberts. The AC-130 was then directed to attack the large groupings of enemy combatants currently exposed on top of the mountain, one to three minutes before the Mako 30 was scheduled to arrive. When the Chinook dropped off the SEALs back on top of the mountain, they came under immediate fire, and Air Force combat controller Technical Sergeant John A. Chapman was seriously injured, along with two Navy SEALs. Mako 30 was forced off the peak due to the heavy fire, and believing him to be dead, left Technical Sergeant Chapman behind on the mountain, wounded, but alive. The Ranger quick reaction force (QRF) force located at Bagram Air Base and led by Captain Nate Self, was called in to search for the SEAL who fell out of the helicopter and Technical Sergeant Chapman, both of whom had been left behind on top of the mountain.

Around this time command decided to change the frequencies for satellite radio communications which different units, including the AFO teams in their reconnaissance positions, were relying on to conduct and adapt the mission as the battle unfolded. One of the generals in overall charge of the events at Takur Ghar ordered the radio frequencies switched to prevent the plan being modified. Though the change may have been meant to enhance direct control of the rescue of the downed SEAL atop Takur Ghar, it had the critical effect of severely limiting communications between the different teams participating in the battle.

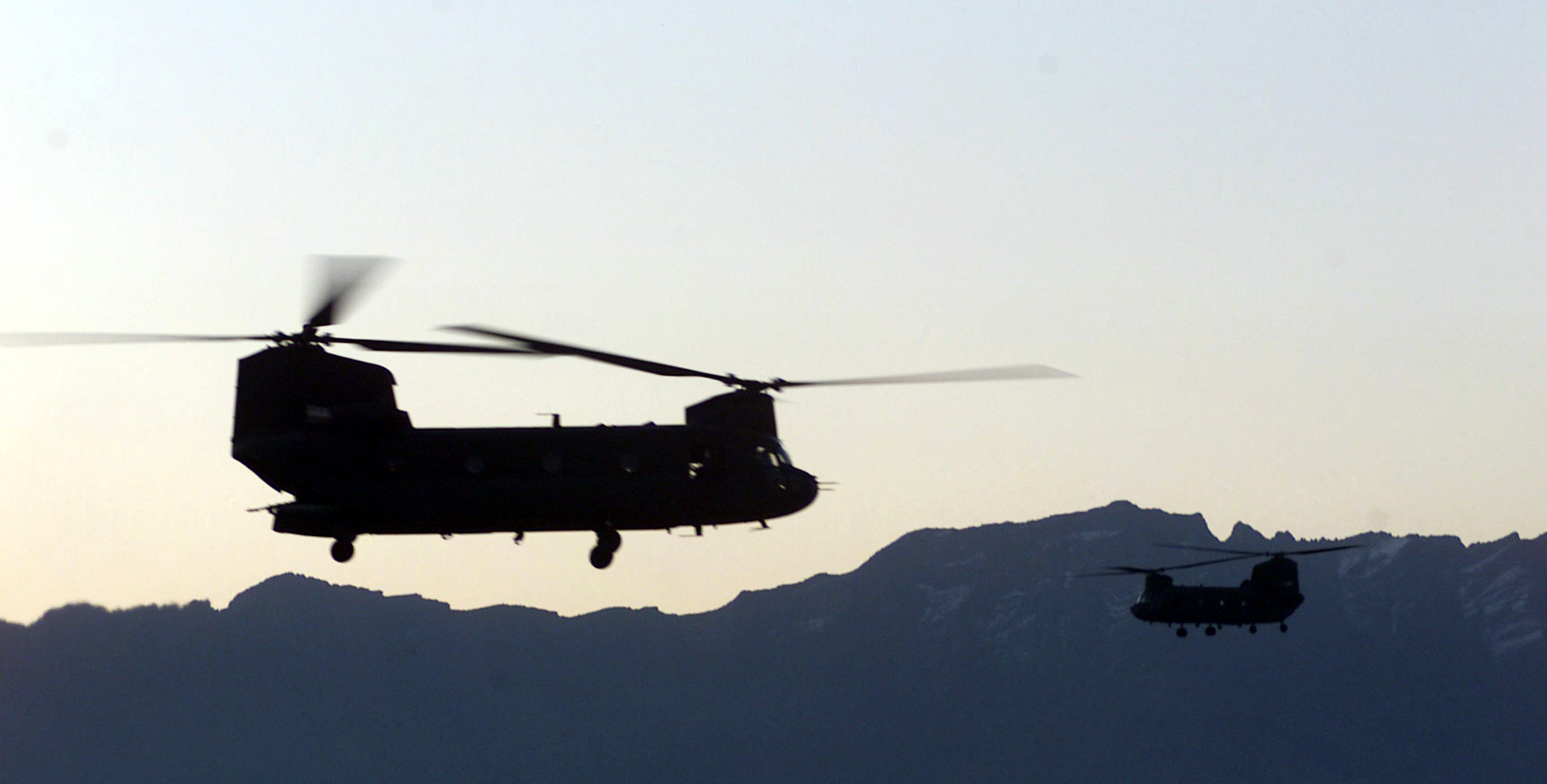
Ch-47 Chinook helicopters take off in the early morning in support of Operation Anaconda, March 2002.

At 03:45, the Ranger quick reaction force was dispatched to the area. Though they were not given a specific mission, they were to establish communication for further instructions upon reaching Gardez, 10 minutes from the mountain. The quick reaction force consisted of 19 Rangers, a Tactical Air Control Party (Tacp), and a three-man USAF special tactics team carried by two Chinooks, Razor 01 and Razor 02. As Air Force rules prohibited AC-130 aircraft from remaining in hostile airspace in daylight after the crash of an AC-130 in Khafji in the Gulf War, the AC-130 support protecting Mako 30 was forced to leave before Razor 01 reached the landing zone, although the leadership was aware that Razor 01 was incoming. Unfortunately, the Razor Chinooks had not been equipped with functioning satellite radios to maintain communication with the headquarters in Bagram or, even more critically, the AFO Team's lead. Also, unfortunately, the pilot of the Razor 01 was not told about the enemy's anti-aircraft location on top of the mountain. Due to the satellite communications difficulties (which may have been caused by a little-known space weather effect caused by equatorial plasma bubbles), Razor 01 was mistakenly directed to the "hot" landing zone on the peak at 33°20′34″N 69°12′49″E. Because of this, the Razor 01 flew into the same enemy trap that the SEALs had flown into, with no one able to communicate the reality of the situation.

At approximately 06:10, Razor 01 reached the landing zone. The aircraft immediately began taking fire, and the right door minigunner, Sergeant Phillip Svitak, was killed by small arms fire. Drone footage of the incident showed the mortally wounded Technical Sergeant John A. Chapman drawing fire away from Razor 01 as it landed. This action earned him the Congressional Medal of Honor. A rocket-propelled grenade then hit the helicopter, destroying the right engine and forcing it to crash land. As the Rangers and special tactics team exited the aircraft, Private First Class Matt Commons, posthumously promoted to Corporal, Sergeant Brad Crose, and Specialist Marc Anderson were also killed, leading to a total of three Ranger casualties during the operation. The surviving crew and quick-reaction force at first attempted a daring assault on the Taliban positions but faced tough resistance from concealed insurgent bunkers, which caused the Rangers to retreat and take cover in a hillock where a fierce firefight began. Razor 02, which had been diverted to Gardez as Razor 01 was landing on Takur Ghar, returned with the rest of the quick-reaction force and Lieutenant Commander Hyder at 06:25. With the help of the new arrivals and close air support, the force was able to consolidate its position on the peak. The quick reaction force's Chalk 2 moved up the mountain to assist Chalk 1. While air force jets provided suppressive fire on the mountain top with individual gun runs since Mako 30 was less than 100 metres (110 yd) north of the peak and Chalk 1 with its downed MH-47 was less than 100 m south of the peak. Hyder saw the need to assist Mako 21 who at that time had two dead and two injured, one of them non-ambulatory. It was obvious from this viewpoint that the proximity of friendly forces to the enemy positions was preventing sufficient suppressive firepower from being used due to danger close distance to both Mako 30 and quick reaction force chalk 1. Hyder directed the Chalk 2 leader to continue mission up the mountain and moved, alone, to link up with Mako 21 in order to assist that team's movement away from the peak thereby creating a better situation for air assets to support by fire. An enemy counterattack midday mortally wounded Senior Airman Jason D. Cunningham, a pararescueman. The wounded were refused medical evacuation during the daylight hours, due to risk of another downed helicopter. Mako 30 and Lt. Cmdr. Hyder moved down the mountain with their wounded. Through threat of nearby enemy response elements, hypothermia and shock of wounded personnel, and across nearly 30" of snow in extreme terrain, Mako 21 found a site suitable for an MH-47. The SEAL team set up defenses, attempted to warm the wounded, and waited for dark when a recovery would be attempted.

Australian Special Air Service Regiment (SASR) soldiers inserted with a United States Air Force Combat Controller had infiltrated the area prior to the first helicopter crash undetected as part of a long range reconnaissance mission when the Chinooks went down. They remained undetected in an observation post through the firefight and proved critical in co-ordinating multiple Coalition air strikes to prevent the al-Qaeda fighters from overrunning the downed aircraft, to devastating effect. This, plus the actions of the two SASR officers working with the 10th Mountain Division, earned the commander of the Australian SASR force in Afghanistan the US Bronze Star for his unit's outstanding contribution to the war on terrorism. Australian soldiers had utilised 'virtual reality' style software for mission rehearsal prior to insertion, and this contributed significantly to their situational awareness in the darkness and poor weather conditions. This was the first time this capability had been used for a live combat mission.

At around 20:00, the quick-reaction force and Mako 30/21 were exfiltrated from the Takur Ghar peak. As a result of this action, both Technical Sergeant Chapman and Senior Airman Cunningham were awarded the Air Force Cross, the second-highest award for bravery. In 2018, Chapman's Air Force Cross was upgraded to the Medal of Honor and he was promoted posthumously to the rank of Master Sergeant. US and Afghan sources believe at least 200 Taliban and Al Qaida fighters were killed during the initial assault and subsequent rescue mission.

Also on 4 March, the 2nd Battalion of the Rakkasans air assaulted into the eastern end of the valley, immediately attacking the heights under Apache cover. Meanwhile, the 3rd battalion were dropped into the northern end of the valley with the objective of linking up with the stranded forces at the blocking positions. Supported by 16 Apaches, 5 USMC Cobras helicopters and several A-10A ground attack aircraft; the Rakkasans methodically cleared an estimated 130 caves, 22 bunkers and 40 buildings to finally secure the valley.

===== Fate of Roberts =====
It is not certain whether the sailor died immediately or was killed by opposing soldiers. There is a possibility that Roberts was captured by the al Qaeda fighters, and executed later with a single shot to the back of the head (One of the feeds showed a group of 8-10 fighters huddling around what appeared to be a body; both GRIM 32 and MAKO 30 noted that an IR strobe was active, a video feed showed the fighters passing the IR strobe around). This report has not been confirmed. Major General Frank Hagenbeck did confirm that al-Qaeda fighters were seen (on live video feed from a Predator drone orbiting the firefight) chasing Roberts, and later dragging his body away from the spot where he fell. Another feed from the same Predator showed a puff of heat [from a rifle] and the indistinct figure in front of it fall. Also, the quick-reaction soldiers reported fighters wearing Robert's gear and finding "a helmet with a bullet hole in it, [from which] it was clear the last person [Roberts] to wear it had been shot in the head." Predator drone footage analyzed in 2016 with new technology showed Technical Sergeant Chapman was alive and fighting on the peak after being left by the SEALs, rather than being killed outright as thought by Mako 30. Chapman was seen fighting in a bunker against multiple enemies before stepping into the open and braving enemy small arms fire one last time to allow the quick reaction force helicopter a bit of breathing room.

A paper written by Andrew Milani (Former commander of the 160th Special Operations Aviation Regiment) and Dr. Stephen D. Biddle entitled "Pitfalls of Technology: A Case Study of the battle of Takur Ghar" noted that the Predator was on station 90 minutes after Roberts had fallen; the images that were shot before the Predator had arrived were shot by GRIM-32's Infrared Cameras. although this has not been confirmed by commanders.

=== 5 March 2002 ===
The last remaining AFO team in the Shah-i-Kot Valley was Team Juliet. They investigated a cave and building complex at the eastern end of the pass. The area had been targeted by multiple air strikes, including a thermobaric bomb that had destroyed the cave on the day of the operation's start. Team Juliet used their ATVs to conduct a passage of lines with the TF Rakkasan elements. They then boarded their Chinook and flew back to Gardez, meaning that every AFO team had now left the valley.

Plans were put in motion to bring in fresh troops for the clearing of the Shah-i-Kot valley, such as troops of the 4th Battalion, 31st Infantry Regiment and allied Canadian troops. However, there was very little fighting after the events at Takur Ghar, and the U.S. commanders simply chose to take a passive approach and allow the surrounding fires to eliminate the enemy forces.

=== 10 March 2002 ===
Major Bryan Hilferty stated that the "major battle ended three or four days ago." The U.S. sent 400 of its troops back to base. Efforts were organized to convene the Afghan warlords Zia Lodin and Gul Haidar. Their collaboration aimed to formulate a final offensive to sweep the valley floor and rid the villages of any remaining Al-Qaeda presence. Mark Rosengard maintained his belief in nurturing a sense of ownership and pride among the Afghans. He emphasized that the Afghans themselves needed to lead the operation to clear the villages, ensuring their active involvement in the process. Attempting to facilitate cooperation between Zia Lodin and Gul Haidar posed significant challenges. It was evident that there existed a history between these two men, marked by a lack of mutual trust, although the exact details remained elusive to the Americans. Zia Lodin, a Pashtun commander, held distinct differences from Gul Haidar, a Tajik from Logar Province, who served as the Afghan defense minister and had a background with the Northern Alliance.

The primary point of contention between these two men was the order in which they would enter the valley. Both were wary that being the first to advance would leave them with their back turned towards the other, who might potentially take advantage of the situation and shoot them from behind. This disagreement stemmed from their mutual distrust and added complexity to their collaboration efforts. Nevertheless, the Americans ultimately succeeded in convincing the warlords to cooperate and sweep into the valley on 12 March.

=== 12 March 2002 ===
The Afghan troops finally initiated their belated sweep into the valley using a pincer-style attack. A significant aspect of this operation was Gul Haidar's inclusion of a column of T-55 tanks. The U.S. military leadership believed these tanks could play a crucial role in this final operation, despite intelligence suggesting that it was unlikely that any enemy combatants remained in the valley. The American troops accompanying Gul Haidar's forces were impressed by his leadership qualities. An illustrative example of this was when his tank column encountered several antitank mines partially buried along the path. Gul Haidar took charge of the situation and personally used a grabbing hook to secure the mines. This garnered both respect and concern from the Americans, who were worried about the commander's safety. The only issue happened at one point when Haidar's tanks mistakenly fired upon the Rakkasan troops positioned on the mountainside. A T-55 tank crew accidentally fired a main gun round that went right through a pup tent belonging to 2-187 Infantry. Fortunately, no one was injured, and swift radio communication corrected the error.

Meanwhile, Zia Lodin's forces, accompanied by Pete Blaber himself, were engaged in clearing the valley's southern end. This time, the Afghan troops had the freedom to conduct the operation according to their own strategies, and this made a big difference. Blaber noted that the Afghan troops were highly motivated because they were actually using their own tactics this time. By this point, the operation was nearing its conclusion, with no combat taking place after Takur Ghar except for a minor engagement on 17 March. Zia's troops continued to clear the deserted villages within the valley, but there was minimal sign of either civilians or enemy combatants. The operation officially continued for a few more days but during this time, the focus shifted to counting bodies and verifying enemy casualties rather than encountering further fighting.

=== 13 March 2002 ===
The Rakkasans were replaced by fresh elements from the 10th Mountain Division, who continued to clear the southern end of the Shah-i-Kot. AFO teams launched further Recce teams into the nearby Naka Valley, hunting for al-Qaeda terrorists that had escaped but did not find anything. By this day, following heavy bombing by U.S. strike fighter aircraft, joint U.S. and Afghan forces swept through the valley and cleared it of remaining rebel forces, with little significant combat by 18 March. A total of 8 U.S. soldiers, sailors, and airmen were killed and 82 wounded, along with several Afghan militiamen; U.S. estimates of other casualties vary, indicating rebel casualties between 500 and 800 and at least 14 civilian casualties. An undetermined number of rebels are said to have escaped the fighting through rugged terrain.

=== 17 March 2002 ===
Task Force 11 received time-sensitive intelligence that a possible high-value target was traveling within a convoy of al-Qaeda fighters who were attempting to escape by vehicle from Shah-i-Kot into Pakistan. A Predator UAV had the convoy under surveillance, showing 3 SUVs, a pickup truck, and a large security element of gunmen. The TF 11 element assigned to the mission included SEAL operators from DEVGRU (commanded by the SEAL who led the Mako 30 mission on Takur Ghar) and attached British SBS operators, with a mixed force of Rangers as back up. The operators and an assigned CSAR team boarded 3 MH-47Es while the Rangers climbed aboard a pair of MH-60G Blackhawks, launching from Bagram in the early morning. The MH-47Es carrying the SEALs caught up to their targets: the lead Chinook landed in front of the convoy; as the occupants leapt out of their vehicles, the door gunner hosed the vehicles down with his minigun, cutting down a number of al-Qaeda terrorists; the second Chinook overshot the column and raked it with minigun fire as it passed. The TF 11 operators added their firepower. Two Chinooks then landed their passengers in cover nearby and the operators took up positions overlooking the convoy. Both teams of SEAL operators now opened fire down on the enemy fighters in a crossfire and the third Chinook landed its operators nearby to investigate a suspicious looking vehicle. The firefight was over in minutes; of the 18 al-Qaeda fighters, 16 were killed and two were wounded. The fighters were a mix of well equipped Uzbeks, Chechens, and Arabs. The operators recovered a lot of US military equipment: a US-made suppressor, a number of US fragmentation grenades issued to TF 11 and a Garmin handheld GPS, later traced to the crew of Razor 01.

=== 18 March 2002 ===
General Tommy Franks declared Operation Anaconda over, later describing it "an unqualified and complete success." Investigative reporter Seymour Hersh refuted the official account, describing it as "in fact a debacle, plagued by squabbling between the services, bad military planning and avoidable deaths of American soldiers, as well as the escape of key al-Qaeda leaders, likely including Osama bin Laden."

== Assessment ==
At the end of Operation Anaconda, the US and Afghan forces had succeeded at removing the majority of the Al-Qaeda and Taliban presence from the Shah-i-Kot Valley. The US forces suffered 80 casualties in the operation, with 8 killed and 72 wounded. An undetermined number of Afghan fighters were also killed in the Operation Anaconda. Estimates of Al-Qaeda and Taliban casualties range from 100 to 1,000, with U.S. commanders favoring the higher estimates and Afghan commanders favoring the lower estimates. The U.S. forces estimated they had killed at least 500 fighters over the duration of the battle, however, journalists later noted that only 23 bodies were found – and critics suggested that after a couple of days, the operation "was more driven by media obsession, than military necessity".

Security expert Bill Roggio argued that al-Qaeda "took a beating during the battle, [but] they were by no means defeated".

A significant critique of Operation Anaconda centered around the lack of air support that the Rakkasan troops relied upon. General Hagenbeck expressed frustration about the delays in getting requested airstrikes when needed. He highlighted in an interview with Field Artillery magazine in September 2002 that there were instances where it took anywhere from twenty-six minutes to several hours for the requested air strikes to actually arrive. This meant that the Infantry positioned in the Halfpipe had to endure extended periods of time lying in the dirt, exposed to enemy fire, without the necessary air cover. While air support proved crucial in assisting the Infantry during the operation, often responding quickly and neutralizing insurgent mortar positions and machine-gun nests as requested, there were other instances in which the air support team failed to adequately assist the ground forces.

Operation Anaconda was also met with criticism from allied coalition forces. According to an interview of some soldiers of the German Special Forces KSK, the post-operation briefing was broken down by an argument between the KSK soldiers and U.S. soldiers. The cause of the conflict is said to have been the complaint of some U.S. soldiers that the KSK soldiers had only changed their position when a shepherd stumbled into their hideout instead of killing him. "Use your silenced gun, then move on."

"The U.S. soldiers would in fact eliminate such 'threats,' says a former KSK officer. (...) The Germans are quoted to have witnessed U.S. Forces flattening entire villages during Operation Anaconda: 'Let's go, free to pillage' (...). A former KSK commander is quoted in the German magazine Stern to have said: 'The pictures of Abu Ghraib, the torture in Iraqi prison camps, did absolutely not surprise me.'

In the wake of Operation Anaconda, relations between US and UK forces on the ground soured when Stars and Stripes, the magazine for American forces and their families, openly criticized the Royal Marines for returning "empty-handed" from their search for al-Qaeda and Taliban fighters claiming that Britain's contribution to the campaign was "disappointing." Relations were further soured with reports from a number of publications that Osama bin Laden might have escaped due to a substantial delay from the original H-hour of the deployment of American Forces.

Stephen Biddle has characterized Operation Anaconda as a "series of surprisingly orthodox ground battles." He rejects the popular characterization of the operation as a guerilla war.

=== Long-distance sniper record ===
The record for the longest combat kill by a sniper was during Operation Anaconda by the Canadian Army sniper Corporal Rob Furlong of the 3rd Battalion Princess Patricia's Canadian Light Infantry and held for seven years until it was surpassed in 2009. Using a McMillan TAC-50 .50-calibre rifle, Furlong killed a Taliban fighter armed with an RPK machine gun at a confirmed distance of 2,430 meters (1.51 miles). A few days prior to Furlong's shot, his teammate, Arron Perry, also from the 3rd Battalion PPCLI, had set the previous record of 2,310 metres (7,580 ft), meaning that a new record was achieved twice during the operation.

The five-man team, including MCpl Graham Ragsdale, MCpl Tim McMeekin, MCpl Arron Perry, Cpl Dennis Eason, and Cpl Rob Furlong, killed over 20 enemy fighters during the operation and were awarded Bronze Star medals by the United States for their service.

== Aftermath ==
After defeating Taliban and Al-Qaeda forces in the Shah-i-Kot valley, coalition forces launched a series of follow-up operations codenamed "Operation Jacana" starting 16 April. These operations aimed to tackle insurgents who were expected to regroup and launch guerrilla attacks in surrounding areas. The British Defense Secretary, Geoff Hoon, announced the largest deployment of British combat forces since the Gulf War in 1991. Around 1,700 Royal Marines, including troops from 45 Commando, were sent to Afghanistan for these planned operations. Franks and Hagenbeck anticipated many more battles ahead, stating that there were ‘thousands of enemies [still] out there’. In fact, this assumption turned out to be completely false, and Operation Anaconda became the last major battle in Afghanistan for the next several years. This led many Royal Marines to complain that they had been deployed "a month too late", as the combat action that they had anticipated did not materialize.

The 10th Mountain Division carried out intelligence-driven operations to locate any remaining Al-Qaeda and Taliban insurgents but did not find much, as it appeared that the jihadists had either escaped to Pakistan or gone into hiding in remote areas of Afghanistan. A large proportion of the US forces found themselves in a state of waiting, eager to act, but with no immediate tasks at hand. The troops of the Royal Canadian Infantry Corps found themselves in a similar situation, spending only 5 out of 120 days actively engaged in operations outside their bases. By July the tactical-level units from the 10th Mountain Division and the 101st Airborne Division, including TF Rakkasan, had all departed Afghanistan; the CTF Mountain headquarters staff followed in early September. They were replaced by CTF 82, formed from the headquarters of the 82d Airborne Division and led by the division's commander, Major General John R. Vines. CTF 82's headquarters was at Bagram Airfield, and Vines-based TF Panther, his primary maneuver element, at the Kandahar Airfield. TF Panther was under the command of Colonel James L. Huggins and had two infantry battalions from the 3d Brigade of the 82d Airborne Division and one attached infantry battalion from the division's 1st Brigade. Huggins also had support from artillery, aviation, military intelligence, and other units. TF Panther deployed to Afghanistan in late June 2002 and would serve under CTF 82 until 5 December 2002. At that point TF Devil, a unit formed around the 1st Brigade, 82d Airborne Division arrived to take the lead in tactical-level security operations.

The Taliban subsequently portrayed the operation as a "historical battle" and a "beginning of the sacred jihad against the occupation of Afghanistan", praising Saif-ur-Rehman Mansoor's leadership. The battle and Mansoor (who was killed in 2008) were eulogized by the Taliban's official website, Voice of Jihad, on 7 March 2021.

== See also ==
- War in Afghanistan
- Mountain warfare
- Special Activities Division
- Timeline of the history of Afghanistan
