= John A. Chapman =

American Medal of Honor recipient (1965–2002)

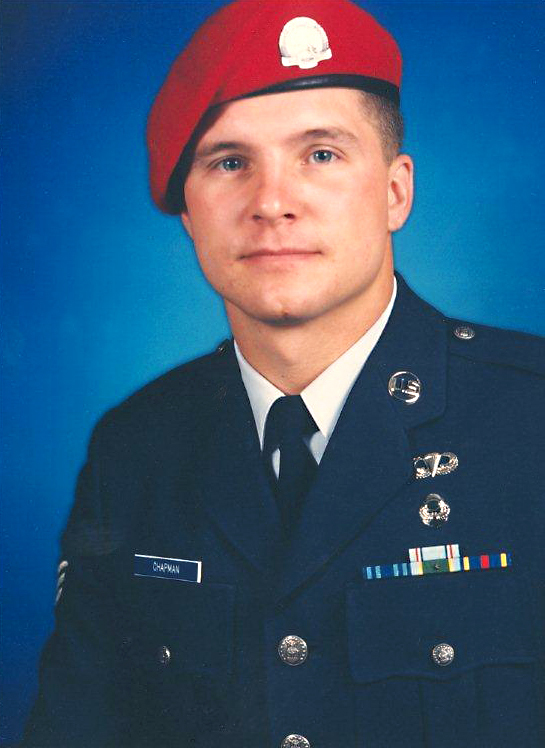
- Chapman in uniform
- Born: July 14, 1965; Springfield, Massachusetts, United States
- Died: March 4, 2002 (aged 36); Takur Ghar, Paktia, Afghanistan
- Burial place: Saint Mary Byzantine Catholic Church Cemetery, Windber, Pennsylvania
- Spouse: Valerie Nessel (m. 1992)
- Children: 2
- Military career
- Allegiance: United States
- Branch: United States Air Force
- Service years: 1985–2002
- Rank: Technical sergeant, Posthumously given the rank of master sergeant
- Units: 21st Special Tactics Squadron; 320th Special Tactics Squadron; 24th Special Tactics Squadron
- Conflicts: War in Afghanistan; Operation Anaconda; Battle of Takur Ghar †
- Awards: Medal of Honor; Purple Heart

John Allan Chapman (July 14, 1965 – March 4, 2002) was a combat controller in the United States Air Force who was posthumously awarded the Medal of Honor on August 22, 2018, for his actions in the Battle of Takur Ghar during the War in Afghanistan. He is the first airman to receive the Medal of Honor since the Vietnam War. He was inducted into the Hall of Heroes on August 23, 2018, and posthumously promoted to Master Sergeant on the following day.

Chapman was also the first Air Force combat controller to be awarded the Air Force Cross, before his decoration was upgraded to the Medal of Honor, making him just the 19th member of the United States Air Force to receive the Medal of Honor. (Note: The US Air Force (USAF) did not exist until 1948, so did not exist during the first 87 years that the Medal of Honor (MOH) existed, during conflicts for which the majority of MOH (3,087 of 3,555, as of August 2026) have been awarded. Furthermore, USAF personnel were not historically deployed into direct combat on the ground, with increased situations where MOH valor might be exhibited. With changes in equipment and tactics since the Korean War, enlisted USAF personnel have been more directly engaged in frontline actions, more so since the end of the Vietnam War. As of August 2026, only 33 MOH have been awarded post-Vietnam War, to all services, with Chapman the sole USAF recipient during that time.)

== Early life ==
John Chapman was born July 14, 1965, in Springfield, Massachusetts, to Eugene and Terry Chapman and grew up in Windsor Locks, Connecticut. He has two sisters, Lori and Tammy, and a brother, Kevin. He graduated from Windsor Locks High School in 1983.

== Military career ==
=== Information Systems Operator ===
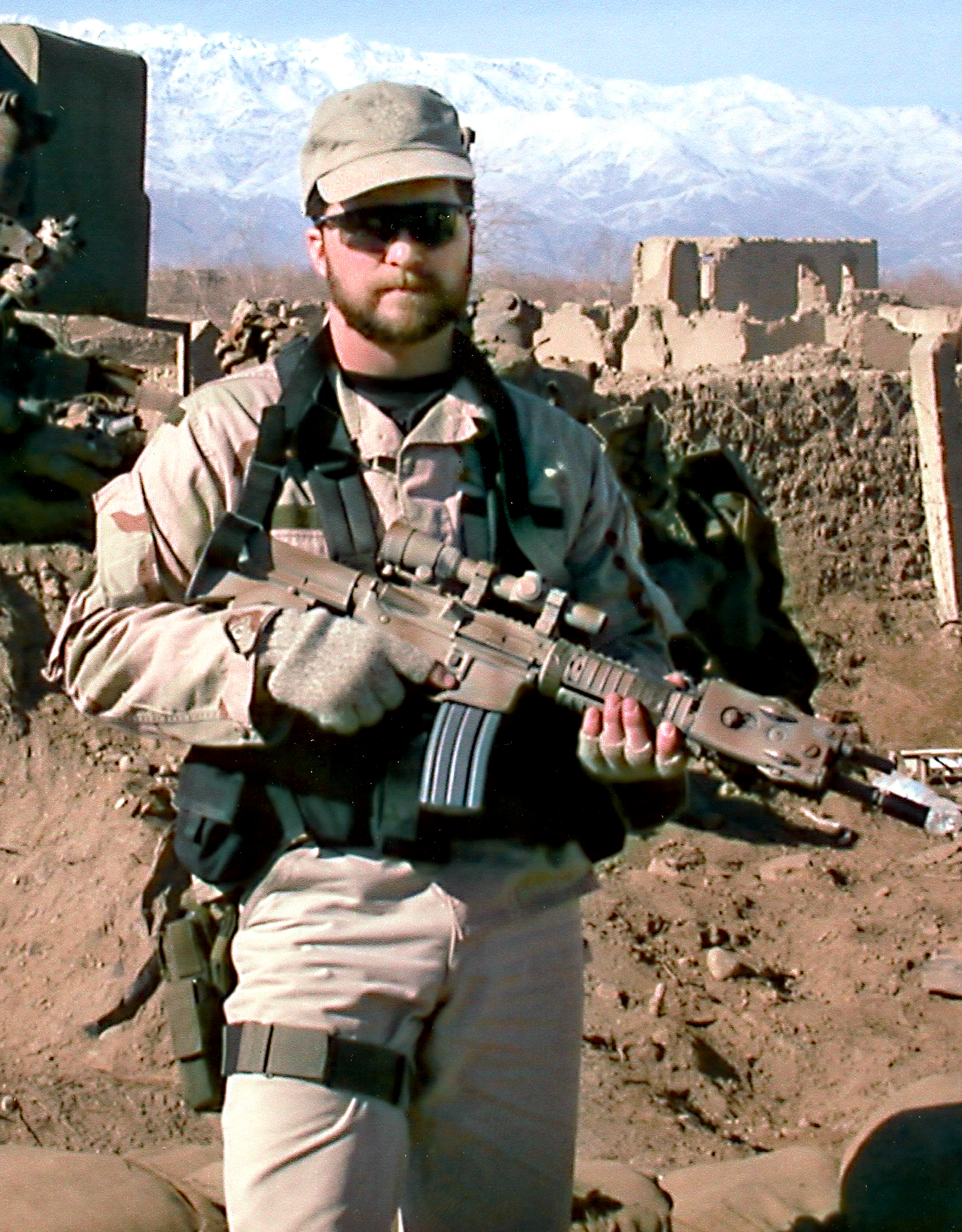
Chapman in Afghanistan

Chapman enlisted in the United States Air Force on September 27, 1985, and was trained as an information systems operator. His first assignment was with the 1987th Information Systems Squadron at Lowry Air Force Base, Colorado, from February 1986 to June 1989.

=== Combat Control Operator ===
Chapman cross-trained into the Combat Control career field and served with the 1721st Combat Control Squadron at Pope Air Force Base, North Carolina, from August 1990 to November 1992.

He was a Special Tactics team member with the 320th Special Tactics Squadron at Kadena Air Base on Okinawa from November 1992 to October 1995. His final assignment was with the 24th Special Tactics Squadron at Pope Air Force Base.

=== Operation Enduring Freedom ===
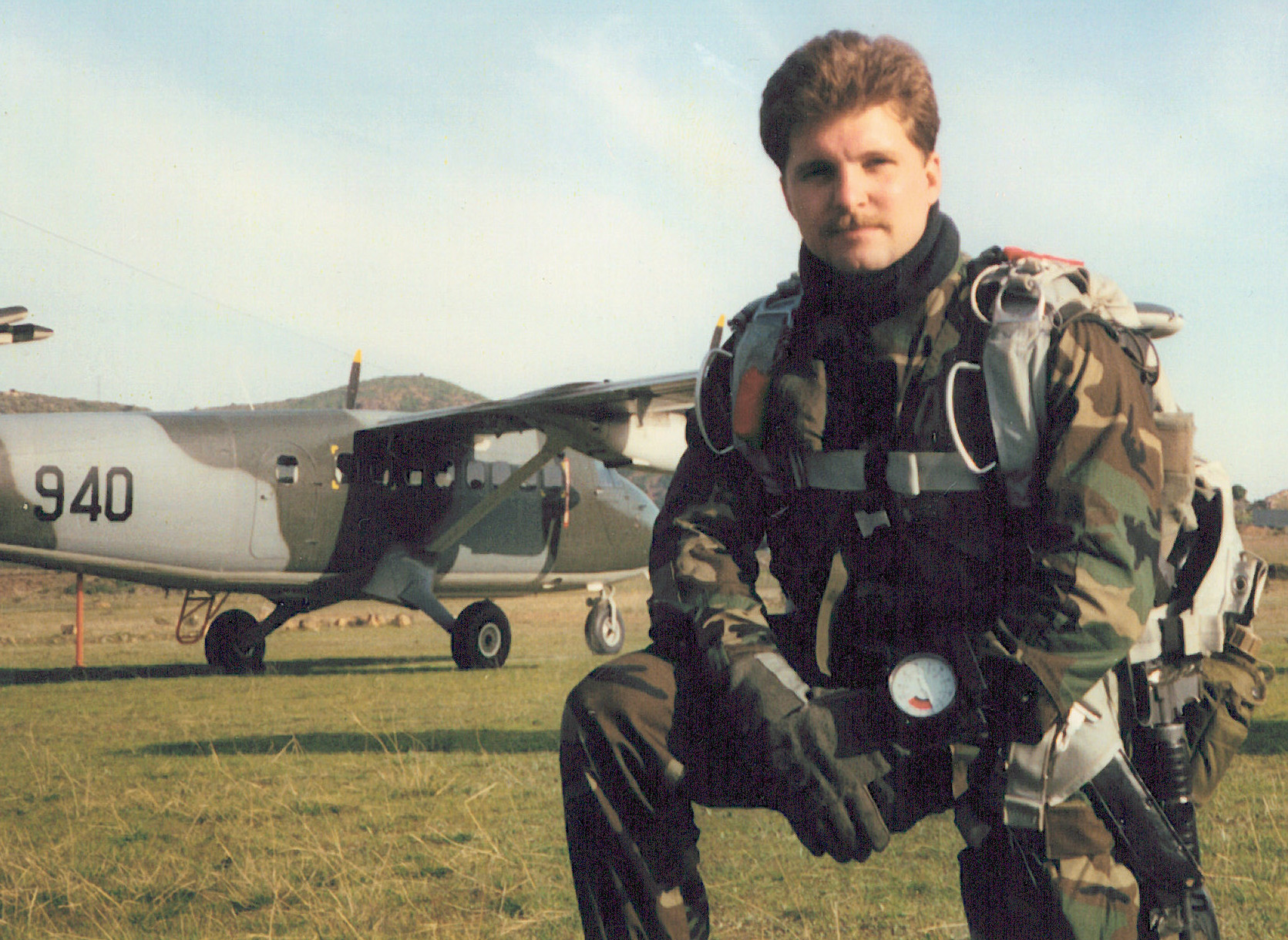
Chapman geared for a parachute jump

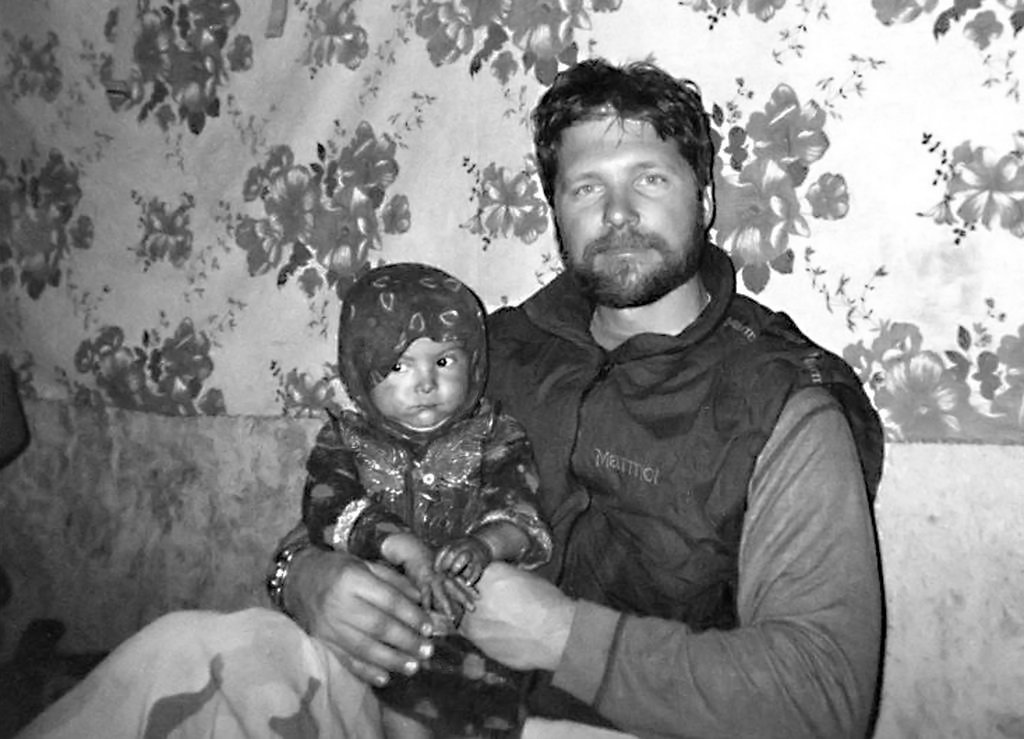
Chapman with an Afghan girl in a safehouse in Afghanistan

On March 4, 2002, Chapman and members of the United States Navy SEAL Team Six took part in Operation Anaconda. A Boeing MH-47E Chinook came under enemy fire, causing Navy SEAL Neil C. Roberts to fall. The helicopter landed 4.5 miles (7.2 km) away from where Roberts was killed. Once on the ground, Chapman called for air support protection until another helicopter could pick them up. He and the team volunteered to rescue Roberts from the enemy stronghold.

Upon returning to recover Roberts, the team came under fire from three directions. Chapman charged forward, killing two enemy soldiers and advancing towards a defensive fighting in Bunker 1 from minimal personal cover, and he received multiple wounds. His engagement and destruction of the first enemy position and advancement to the second enabled his team to move to cover and break enemy contact. He is credited with saving the lives of the entire SEAL Team Six team.

Once Bunker 1 was clear, Chapman was hit and went down. His SEAL team leader, Britt Slabinski, failing to check Chapman for signs of life, ordered his SEAL teammates to retreat down the mountain, leaving Chapman alone. Despite being mortally wounded, Chapman came to and engaged enemy combatants at Bunker 2 for an hour and twenty minutes. He sustained gunshot wounds, shrapnel wounds, cuts and bruises from hand-to-hand combat, and concussive injuries from the American bombs called to his position by Slabinski. With the morning in full light, Chapman heard another incoming Chinook. It was the Quick Reaction Force (QRF) called in by Slabinski. Chapman knew it would suffer the same fate as the first two helos, which would likely result in many American deaths, if not all aboard. Knowing that the enemy wanted his position, he made the decision to leave cover in order to protect the QRF with suppressive fire. As he lay prone, firing at an entrenched machine gun position, an enemy fighter fired the round that ultimately killed him. Though five men from the QRF were killed, Chapman's actions allowed those on the helo time to defend their location and saved lives.

== Air Force Cross upgraded to the Medal of Honor ==
=== Air Force Cross ===
Chapman was posthumously awarded the Air Force Cross. The citation for the award reads:

The President of the United States of America, authorized by Title 10, Section 8742, U.S.C., awards the Air Force Cross to TSgt John Chapman for extraordinary heroism in military operation against an armed enemy of the United States as a 24th Special Tactics Squadron, combat controller in the vicinity of Gardez, in the eastern highlands of Afghanistan, on March 4, 2002. On this date, during his helicopter insertion for a reconnaissance and time sensitive targeting close air support mission, Sergeant Chapman's aircraft came under heavy machine gun fire and received a direct hit from a rocket propelled grenade which caused a United States Navy sea-air-land team member to fall from the aircraft. Though heavily damaged, the aircraft egressed the area and made an emergency landing seven kilometers away. Once on the ground Sergeant Chapman established communication with an AC-130 gunship to ensure the area was secure while providing close air support coverage for the entire team. He then directed the gunship to begin the search for the missing team member. He requested, coordinated, and controlled the helicopter that extracted the stranded team and aircrew members. These actions limited the exposure of the aircrew and team to hostile fire. Without regard for his own life Sergeant Chapman volunteered to rescue his missing team member from an enemy stronghold. Shortly after insertion, the team made contact with the enemy. Sergeant Chapman engaged and killed two enemy personnel. He continued to advance reaching the enemy position then engaged a second enemy position, a dug-in machine gun nest. At this time, the rescue team came under effective enemy fire from three directions. From close range he exchanged fire with the enemy from minimum personal cover until he succumbed to multiple wounds. His engagement and destruction of the first enemy position and advancement on the second position enabled his team to move to cover and break enemy contact. In his own words, his Navy sea-air-land team leader credits Sergeant Chapman unequivocally with saving the lives of the entire rescue team. Through his extraordinary heroism, superb airmanship, aggressiveness in the face of the enemy, and the dedication to the service of his country, Sergeant Chapman reflects the highest credit upon himself and the United States Air Force.

=== Medal of Honor ===
Air Force Cross

Fourteen years after Chapman's death, Air Force Secretary Deborah Lee James began attempting to have Chapman awarded the Medal of Honor, the military's highest award, after new technology that allowed a deeper analysis of video of the battle suggested Chapman regained consciousness and resumed fighting Al-Qaeda members who were coming toward him from three directions. Chapman may have crawled into a bunker, shot and killed an enemy charging at him and then killed another enemy fighter in hand-to-hand combat.

While the Air Force pushed for Chapman to be recognized, Naval Special Warfare Command allegedly attempted to block Chapman's Medal of Honor as it would result in an admission that Chapman had been left behind. When it became apparent that Chapman's Medal of Honor could not be blocked, it was further alleged that the Navy put the commander of the operation, Britt K. Slabinski, up for the same award, which he received in May 2018. In March 2018, Chapman's family was notified that his Air Force Cross was to be upgraded to the Medal of Honor.

The citation accompanying his upgrade to the Medal of Honor reads as follows:

Technical Sergeant John A. Chapman distinguished himself by extraordinary heroism as an Air Force Special Tactics combat controller, attached to a Navy Sea, Air, and Land (SEAL) Team conducting reconnaissance operations in Takur Ghar, Afghanistan, on March 4, 2002. During insertion, the team's helicopter was ambushed causing a teammate to fall into an entrenched group of enemy combatants below. Sergeant Chapman and the team voluntarily reinserted onto the snow-capped mountain, into the heart of a known enemy stronghold to rescue one of their own. Without regard for his own safety, Sergeant Chapman immediately engaged, moving in the direction of the closest enemy position despite coming under heavy fire from multiple directions. He fearlessly charged an enemy bunker, up a steep incline in thigh-deep snow and into hostile fire, directly engaging the enemy. Upon reaching the bunker, Sergeant Chapman assaulted and cleared the position, killing all enemy occupants. With complete disregard for his own life, Sergeant Chapman deliberately moved from cover only 12 meters from the enemy, and exposed himself once again to attack a second bunker, from which an emplaced machine gun was firing on his team. During this assault from an exposed position directly in the line of intense fire, Sergeant Chapman was struck and injured by enemy fire. Despite severe, mortal wounds, he continued to fight relentlessly, sustaining a violent engagement with multiple enemy personnel before making the ultimate sacrifice. By his heroic actions and extraordinary valor, sacrificing his life for the lives of his teammates, Technical Sergeant Chapman upheld the highest traditions of military service and reflected great credit upon himself and the United States Air Force.

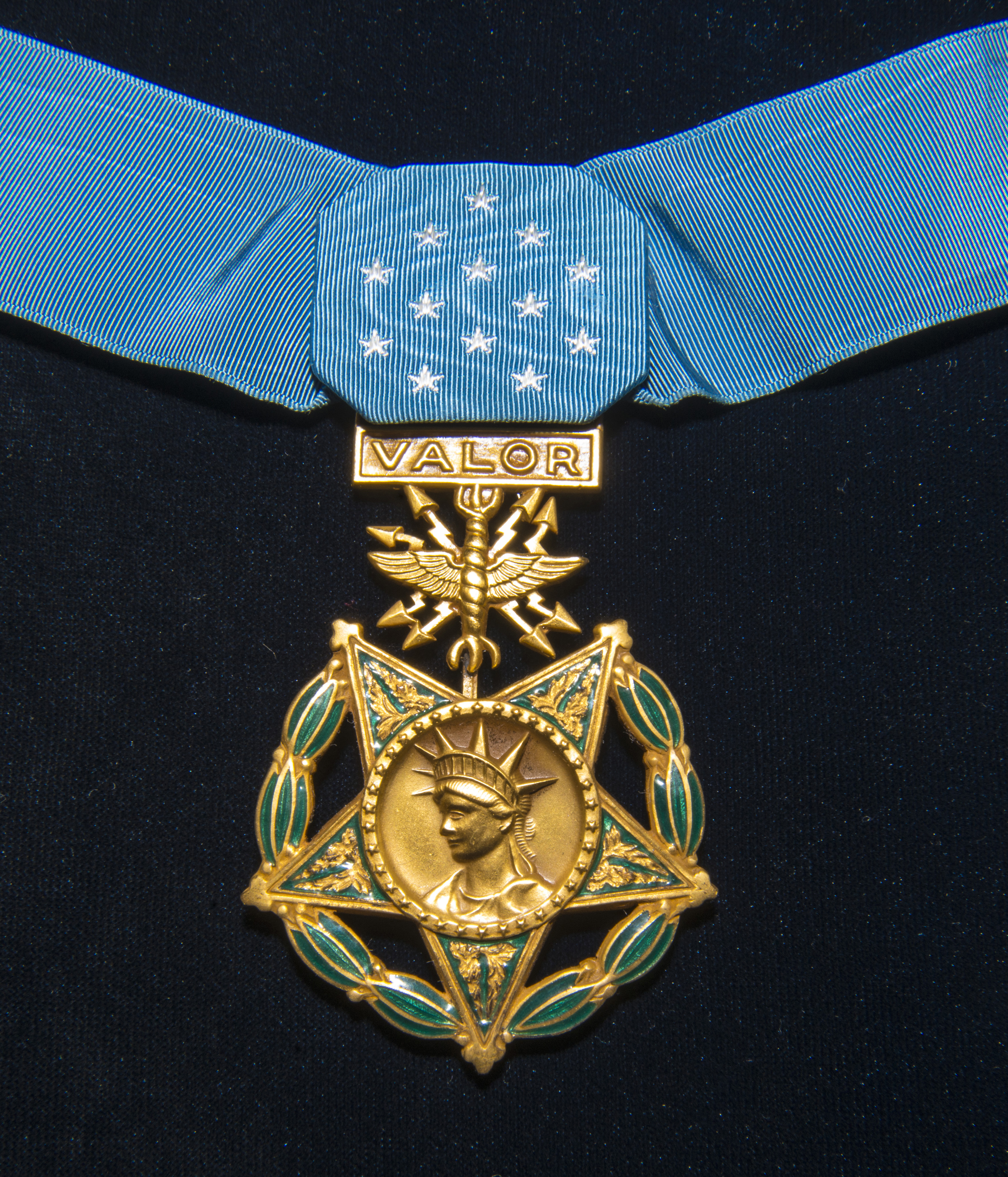
Medal of Honor

The ceremony took place Wednesday, August 22, 2018. At an August 23 ceremony at the Pentagon attended by family and teammates, Chapman was inducted into the Hall of Heroes, a room dedicated to honor Medal of Honor recipients. The next day, he was posthumously promoted to the rank of Master Sergeant and his name was added to the Medal of Honor wall at the Air Force Memorial.

== Personal life ==
Chapman met Valerie Novak in 1990 while he and a friend were visiting her hometown of Windber, Pennsylvania. They married in 1992 and had two daughters, Madison and Brianna.

Chapman is buried at Saint Mary's Byzantine Catholic Church Cemetery in Windber.

== Awards and decorations ==
Chapman received the following awards and decorations:

Badge	Master Parachutist Badge		
Badge	Military Freefall Parachutist Badge		
1st row	Medal of Honor		Purple Heart
2nd row	Air Force Commendation Medal with 1 bronze Oak leaf cluster	Joint Service Achievement Medal with 1 bronze Oak leaf cluster	Air Force Achievement Medal with 1 bronze Oak leaf cluster
3rd row	Air Force Combat Action Medal	Joint Meritorious Unit Award	Air Force Outstanding Unit Award with "V" device and 1 bronze Oak leaf cluster
4th row	Air Force Good Conduct Medal with 4 bronze Oak leaf clusters	National Defense Service Medal with 1 bronze Service star	Afghanistan Campaign Medal with 1 Campaign star
5th row	Global War on Terrorism Expeditionary Medal	Global War on Terrorism Service Medal	Armed Forces Service Medal
6th row	Humanitarian Service Medal	Air Force Overseas Long Tour Service Ribbon	Air Force Longevity Service Award with 3 Oak leaf clusters
7th row	NCO Professional Military Education Graduate Ribbon	Small Arms Expert Marksmanship Ribbon with 1 Service star	Air Force Training Ribbon
Badge	Air Force Scuba Diver insignia		

== Legacy ==
Chapman's actions in the Battle of Takur Ghar were recorded from multiple angles from circling aircraft and are reported to be the first Medal of Honor actions ever recorded on video.

The Military Sealift Command logistics ship MV TSgt John A. Chapman (T-AK-323) was renamed in his honor in 2005.

Dan Schilling and Chapman's sister, Lori Chapman Longfritz, wrote a book based on his Medal of Honor action titled Alone at Dawn: Medal of Honor Recipient John Chapman and the Untold Story of the World's Deadliest Special Operations Force. When it was published, it was optioned by Thruline Entertainment for a feature adaptation. In October 2025, it was announced that the film, Alone at Dawn, with Adam Driver and Anne Hathaway attached to star as Chapman and his sister, was to begin filming in November 2025, in Maryland and Hungary.

In April 2023, the United States Air Force Academy graduating class of 2026 selected Chapman as their class exemplar, honored with the nickname "Sarge". Chapman is the first enlisted person to be chosen by an Academy graduating class.

According to retired green beret Nate Cornacchia in a post on YouTube, the upcoming Medal of Honor museum in Arlington, Texas was going to have an exhibit dedicated to John Chapman but has since been canceled and replaced with Britt Slabinski, who is on the museum board. Per Chapman's sister, Lori Chapman Longfritz, the museum gave her a tour in February 2024 while it was being built. She was shown where John's exhibit would be and she offered artifacts from the family. In November 2024, she learned that the museum would not in fact be honoring Chapman ... the first airman to receive the Medal of Honor since Vietnam and the first to be recorded. Instead, they chose to reduce Chapman to a photo on the wall and an edited and muted version of the historic drone video. Slabinski, whose citation credits him with Chapman's actions, is showcased with an enormous exhibit including a glass case with two uniforms: his white Navy uniform and the one he allegedly wore during the battle. There are supposedly bullet holes in the leg, however Slabinski never suffered any injuries. The museum honors every recipient on the anniversaries of their birthdays. On July 14, 2025, the museum failed to remember Chapman's birthday. The Navy SEALs appear to be attempting to distance Slabinski from Chapman, even though he would probably not be alive were it not for Chapman.

== See also ==
- List of post-Vietnam War Medal of Honor recipients
