= Battle of Takur Ghar =

2002 battle of the War in Afghanistan, between U.S. and al-Qaeda forces

- Part of Operation Anaconda during the War in Afghanistan
Date	3–4 March 2002; 24 years ago
Location	Takur Ghar, Afghanistan 33°20′30″N 69°12′58″E
Result	Coalition pyrrhic victory

Belligerents
United States	Taliban; Al-Qaeda; Islamic Movement of Uzbekistan

Commanders and leaders
MG Frank Hagenbeck; BG Gregory Trebon; LTC Pete Blaber; CPT Nate Self	Maulvi Saif-ur-Rehman Mansoor

Strength
7 Navy SEALs; 20 Army Rangers; 4 Airmen; 4 MH-47 Chinooks; 1 AC-130 gunship 2 F-15Es; 2 F-16s; 1 Armed Predator Drone	At least 10 at hilltop camp Around 25 in reinforcement

Casualties and losses
7 killed 12 wounded 2 Chinooks lost	20-25 killed

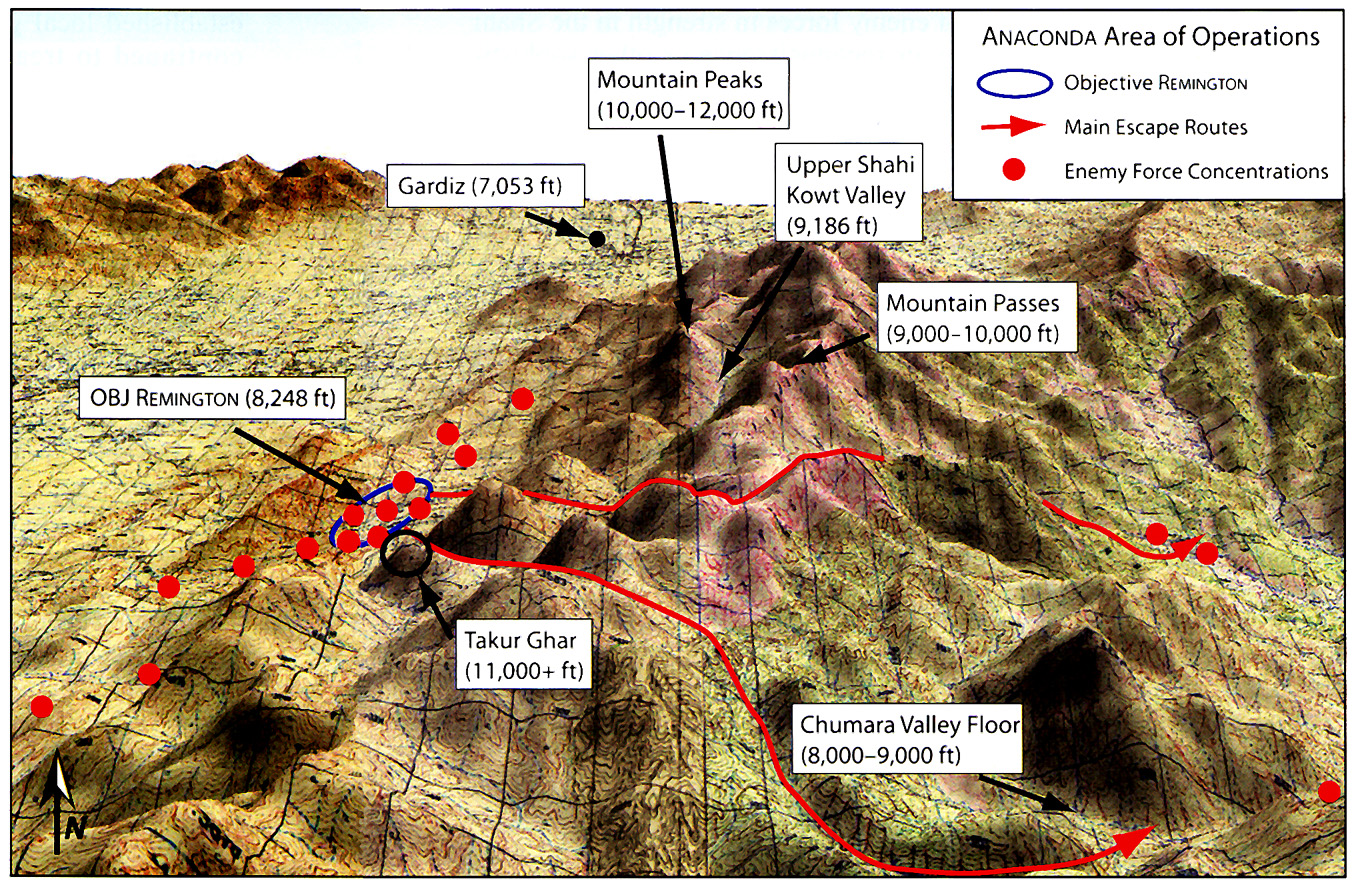
Location of Takur Ghar

The Battle of Takur Ghar was a short but intense military engagement between United States special operations forces and al-Qaeda insurgents fought in March 2002, atop Takur Ghar mountain in Afghanistan during which Senior Chief Petty Officer Britt K. Slabinski left his Combat Controller (CCT), Master Sergeant John A. Chapman who had been killed by enemy machine gunfire and had multiple wounded in his small 6 person recce team. For the U.S. side, the battle proved the deadliest entanglement of Operation Anaconda, an effort early in the War in Afghanistan to rout al-Qaeda forces from the Shahi-Kot Valley and Arma Mountains. The battle saw three helicopter landings by the U.S. on the mountain top, each met with direct assault from al-Qaeda forces. Although Takur Ghar was eventually taken, seven U.S. service members were killed and 12 others were wounded. The battle is also known as the Battle of Roberts Ridge, after the first casualty of the battle, Navy SEAL Neil C. Roberts.

== Prelude ==
In the evening of 3 March 2002, Task Force 11 leadership directed that operational control of the AFO teams already working inside Operation Anaconda be transferred from the Delta/AFO command structure to the incoming SEAL/Task Force Blue command. The SEALs were coming in from Bagram to Gardez, and this effectively changed who was controlling teams that had already been operating in the valley.

== Battle ==
In the late evening of March 3, 2002 two SEAL teams from DEVGRU, MAKO 30 & MAKO 21, led by Lieutenant Commander Vic Hyder (MAKO 21) and Senior Chief Petty Officer Britt K. Slabinski (MAKO 30), were to arrive in Gardez for immediate insertion into the Shah-i-Kot Valley. Both the AFO and MAKO 30 leader has asked for a 24-hour stay, but were ultimately denied. MAKO 21 planned to link up with AFO team Juliet at the northern end of the valley, resupply it and then establish a hide site/observation post on the eastern ridge above Task Force Rakkasan's blocking position; while MAKO 30 planned to establish an observation point on the peak of Takur Ghar, which commanded a view of the Shah-i-Kot valley. Due to time constraints, a helicopter insertion would be needed for the team to reach the peak before dawn. The AFO suggested insertion at a point 1,400 meters (4,600 feet) east of the peak, but due to a delayed B-52 bomber sortie in the area, the team was told to turn back and land at the airstrip near Gardez. Further complications arose during the second lift off as they were delayed due to an air assault in proximity of the LZ. With the threat of daylight getting near, the SEALs chose the peak itself as the insertion point.

The two teams were picked up by two MH-47 Chinook helicopters of the 160th Special Operations Aviation Regiment, Razor 03 and Razor 04, at 11:23 PM on March 3. However, Razor 03 experienced engine difficulties, and two new MH-47s were dispatched to replace the original helicopters. This delay meant that the SEALs could not be inserted into the landing zone east of the peak until 2:30 AM on March 4, with not enough time to reach the peak before daylight.

An AC-130U, Nail 22, flew a reconnaissance mission over the mountain, but cleared the original offset LZ and not the new landing zone at the summit. Therefore its sensors saw no enemy activity and it was called away to support other troops before Razor 03 arrived at the landing zone; MAKO 30 team leader, Senior Chief Petty Officer Britt K. Slabinski, was uneasy at the speed with which the sweep was conducted and wondered whether they had the right mountain but he dismissed his doubts and trusted the gunship’s technology. At around 0245 hours, as Razor 03 flared to land at the LZ and was immediately fired upon by machinegun and RPGs, an RPG struck just behind the cockpit, starting a fire in the cabin. As machinegun rounds penetrated the unarmored Chinook, another RPG, seconds after the first, hit the Chinook's right-side radar pod, which blew out all electrical power to the helicopter, particularly its miniguns and navigational systems. The Chinook was hit by a further 2 RPGs and more heavy automatic weapons fire from at least three distinct firing points (particularly from a supposedly abandoned DShK position). The Chinook set down at a slight depression, shielding the pilots from the DShK's fire.

The pilot, Chief Warrant Officer Alan Mack, made the call to take the stricken helicopter off; as he brought the Chinook back into the air, PO1 Neil C. Roberts fell out of the open ramp. SOAR crew chief Sgt. Dan Madden and Electronics Technician Second Class Brett Morganti grabbed hold of his pack but they lost his grip. Razor 03 attempted to return and retrieve him, but the damage prevented proper control and the helicopter was forced to make an emergency landing in the valley approximately 7km away. Roberts fell 3 m (9.8 ft) into the snow covering Takur Ghar and activated an infrared strobe to mark his position. Razor 04, piloted by Chief Warrant Officer Jason Friel, and MAKO 30 made decision to return to the peak to attempt to rescue Roberts, as the Chinook offloaded MAKO 30, they came under immediate fire from the DShK, though it was relatively unscathed and left the AO after MAKO 30 successfully disembarked.

At first, the insurgents didn't spot MAKO 30 in the early morning darkness, MAKO 30 split up into two-man pairs to conduct bounding movements, making good ground until the enemy spotted them. One team, consisting of Chapman and Slabinski) ran across a concealed al-Qaeda bunker and killed 3 fighters before the SEALs were suppressed by other fighters with a PKM machine gun. The firefight lasted 20 minutes, during which time USAF combat controller Master Sergeant John A. Chapman (then Technical Sergeant) and two SEALs were wounded before MAKO 30 ordered tactical retreat with support from an orbiting AC-130H Spectre (GRIM 32) providing covering fire as they embarked down the ridge.

MAKO 30 requested a QRF (quick-reaction force) mainly made up of Rangers from the 1st Battalion 75th Ranger Regiment located at Bagram Air Base, led by Captain Nate Self. Master Sergeant Chapman was mistakenly believed to have been killed prior to MAKO 30 withdrawing from the peak.

Alone and wounded twice in the torso, facing superior numbers of enemy insurgents, drone footage showed Sergeant Chapman killing at least two of the insurgents, before being killed by a fatal gunshot wound. It would be known later that he was wounded 16 times while providing covering fire to distract Taliban fighters from an approaching rescue helicopter.

The quick reaction force (QRF) consisted of 19 Rangers, Tactical Air Control Party (TACP) Staff Sergeant Kevin Vance, and a three-man USAF special tactics team (PJs and Combat Controllers) carried by two Chinooks, Razor 01 and Razor 02.

As Air Force rules prohibited AC-130 aircraft from remaining in hostile airspace in daylight after the crash of an AC-130 during the Battle of Khafji in the Gulf War, the AC-130 support (callsign GRIM-32), who was providing rounds and protecting MAKO 30 was forced to RTB (return to base) before Razor 01 reached the LZ and attempted to communicate with the incoming CAS to provide situational awareness, however, communication errors hindered the relay and further impacted the QRF from understanding the tactical situation.

Due to satellite communications difficulties, Razor 01 was mistakenly directed to the "hot" LZ on the peak at 33°20′34″N 69°12′49″E.

During the flight, the Ranger commander was informed that his team was to land and extract a "SEAL sniper team" that was in contact with the enemy, which was false.

At approximately 0610 hours, Razor 01, under the command of Captain Nate Self, reached the landing zone. The aircraft immediately began taking fire from RPG, DShK and small arms fire, and the right door minigunner, Sergeant Philip Svitak, was killed and the helicopter pilots, Chief Warrant Officers Greg Calvert and Chuck Gant, were seriously wounded by the small arms fire. An RPG then hit the helicopter, destroying the right engine and forcing it to crash land. As the Rangers and special tactics team exited the aircraft, Private First Class Matt Commons (posthumously promoted to Corporal), Sergeant Brad Crose, and Specialist Marc Anderson were killed (Anderson was shot and killed inside the helicopter while Commons and Crose were gunned down on the helicopter ramp). The surviving crew and quick-reaction force took cover behind a hillock and a fierce firefight began. CPT Self decided to suppress the enemy firing points and launch a counterattack against the peak, bounding forward in subteams (one team firing while the other moved forward). They advanced about 20m before the weight of enemy fire forced them into cover.

Razor 02, which had been diverted to Gardez as Razor 01 was landing on Takur Ghar, returned with the rest of the quick-reaction force at 0625 hours. Razor 02 inserted the other half of the QRF with its force of 10 Rangers at an "offset" landing zone, down the mountain some 800 meters (2,600 feet) east and over 610 meters (2,000 feet) below the mountaintop. The Rangers' movement up the hill was a physically demanding 2-hour effort under heavy mortar fire and in thin mountain air. They climbed the 45-70 degree slope, most of it covered in a meter (3 ft) of snow, weighted down by their weapons, body armor and equipment. By 10:30 am local time, the men covered half of the 50m distance to the enemy positions when they were engaged by PKM fire. They were exhausted and the enemy at the top of the hill a mere 50 meters (160 feet) from their position. Meanwhile, the Rangers on the peak called in several Danger Close gun runs from orbiting F-15E and F-16C aircraft to suppress the enemy before again attempting another ground assault. However, the Ranger commander realized that what they had assumed was fallen logs and foliage was actually a fortified bunker. He ordered his Rangers to withdraw as they did not have enough men to start clearing them and other prepared positions. The attached USAF CCT, Staff Sergeant Gabe Brown vectored in airstrikes to keep the al-Qaeda forces at bay until the rest of the Rangers arrived; the CCT directed a number of strikes on the peak, which were well within the normal safety limits and he also called in a strike from a MQ-1 Predator UAV (which was the first recorded use of the vehicle), one of the two Hellfire missiles it fired collapsed the bunker. As the ten men of Razor 02 arrived, the Rangers prepared to assault the enemy positions. As the Air Force CCT Staff Sergeant Gabe Brown called in a last airstrike on the enemy bunkers and with two machine guns providing suppression fire, 14 Rangers stormed the hill as quickly as they could in the knee-deep snow – shooting and throwing grenades. Within minutes, the Rangers took the hill, killing several al Qaeda fighters.

The force was able to consolidate its position on the peak. An enemy counterattack midday mortally wounded Senior Airman Jason D. Cunningham, a pararescueman who died six hours after being hit. The wounded were refused medical evacuation during the daylight hours, due to risk of another downed helicopter. However, Australian SASR soldiers, along with U.S. Air Force Combat Controller Jim Hotaling, had infiltrated nearby prior to the first helicopter crash as part of a long range reconnaissance mission. They remained undetected in an observation post through the firefight and CCT Jim Hotaling proved critical in co-ordinating multiple Coalition air strikes to prevent the al Qaeda fighters from overrunning the downed aircraft. This, plus the actions of the two SASR operators working with the 10th Mountain, earned the commander of the Australian SASR force in Afghanistan the U.S. Bronze Star for his unit's outstanding contribution to the war on terrorism.

At 20:15 hours, the quick-reaction force and MAKO 30 and MAKO 21 were exfiltrated from the Takur Ghar peak.

For their actions on Takur Ghar, Chapman, Cunningham, and Technical Sergeant Keary J. Miller were awarded the Air Force Cross, the second highest award for bravery. Chapman and Slabinski were, in 2018, awarded the highest and most prestigious personal military decoration in the US, the Medal of Honor. Electronics Technician Second Class Brett Morganti was awarded the Navy Cross.

=== Fate of Roberts ===
It was not certain whether Roberts died immediately or was killed by opposing fighters later. There is a possibility that the soldier was captured by the al Qaeda fighters after being shot in the right leg, and executed later with a single shot to the back of the head. (One of the feeds showed a group of 8–10 fighters huddling around what appeared to be a body; both GRIM-32 and MAKO 30 noted that an IR strobe was active. A video feed showed the fighters passing the IR strobe around.) This report has not been confirmed. MG Frank Hagenbeck did confirm that al Qaeda fighters were seen (on live video feed from a Predator drone orbiting the firefight) chasing Roberts, and later dragging his body away from the spot where he fell. Another feed from the same Predator showed a puff of heat [from a rifle] and the indistinct figure in front of it fall. Also, the quick-reaction soldiers reported fighters wearing Roberts' gear and finding "a helmet with a bullet hole in it, [from which] it was clear the last person [Roberts] to wear it had been shot in the head". Other reports have Roberts surviving for nearly an hour and inflicting serious casualties on opposing forces with his pistol and grenades before his death

=== Fate of Chapman ===
Reports immediately following the battle stated Chapman was killed shortly after he returned to the peak of Takur Ghar with MAKO 30 to rescue Roberts. Slabinski, who had paired up with Chapman as they maneuvered under fire, reported seeing Chapman get struck by a burst from an enemy machinegun. Slabinski initially reported he determined Chapman was dead as he could not see the laser of Chapman's rifle moving as it lay across his chest, indicating to Slabinski that Chapman was no longer breathing. Several years later Slabinski changed his story, stating he crawled over Chapman's body and Chapman did not react, leading Slabinski to think Chapman was dead. With several of the SEALs in MAKO 30 wounded, and thinking Chapman was dead, Slabinski ordered his team back off the mountain, throwing smoke grenades and calling in airstrikes to cover their retreat while leaving Chapman behind believing he was no longer alive.

Predator drone footage from the battle was analyzed with by the Air Force. Using newer technology, they argued it showed Technical Sergeant Chapman was alive and fighting on the peak after the SEALs had retreated, rather than being killed within the first few moments as thought by MAKO 30. The footage also shows that Slabinski never comes close to Chapman's body as he claimed, instead he crawled over Robert's body and in the confusion of the battle he assumed it was Chapman. After being left, and regaining consciousness, Chapman was seen fighting in a bunker against multiple enemies before stepping into the open and braving enemy small arms fire one last time to allow the quick reaction force helicopter coming to rescue him and Roberts a bit of breathing room. The footage shows a man fighting in a bunker against multiple enemies until hit by an RPG. If this man was Chapman, he succumbed to a single gunshot wound from behind "just a mere 45 seconds before... Razor 01 appeared over the mountaintop".

Fourteen years after Chapman's death, Air Force Secretary Deborah Lee James began attempting to have Chapman's Air Force Cross upgraded to the Medal of Honor, the military's highest award, using the new technology that allowed a deeper analysis of video of the battle arguing it showed Chapman regain consciousness after being left on Takur Ghar and resume fighting Al-Qaeda members who were coming toward him from three directions. The Air Force stated Chapman crawled into a bunker, shot, and killed an enemy charging at him and then killed another enemy fighter in hand-to-hand combat and ultimately left the safety of the bunker to provide covering fire for Razor 01 as it too attempted to land on the mountain peak.

While the Air Force pushed for Chapman to be recognized, Naval Special Warfare Command allegedly attempted to block Chapman's Medal of Honor as it would result in an admission that Chapman had been left behind alive. When it became apparent that Chapman's Medal of Honor could not be blocked, it was further alleged that the Navy requested Slabinski's Navy Cross be upgraded to a Medal of Honor as well, which he received in May 2018 before Chapman received his. In March 2018, Chapman's family was notified that his Air Force Cross was to be upgraded to the Medal of Honor and the White House announced on July 27, 2018, that Chapman would posthumously receive the Medal of Honor at an August 22, 2018 ceremony.

Colonel Andrew N. Milani (former commander of the 160th Special Operations Aviation Regiment) and Dr. Stephen D. Biddle noted in their 2003 United States Army War College publication that the Predator was on station 90 minutes after Roberts had fallen; the images that were shot before the Predator had arrived were shot by GRIM-32's Infrared Cameras, although this has not been confirmed by commanders. But in 2016, Milani submitted an addendum to his paper. "With some of the original uncertainty removed, I can state that the probability now lies more in favor of Chapman surviving the original assault", he wrote.

=== U.S. casualties ===
==== Killed ====
SEAL Team Six:

- Petty Officer First Class Neil "Fifi" C. Roberts

USAF 24th Special Tactics Squadron:

- Master Sergeant John A. Chapman

USAF 38th Rescue Squadron:

- Senior Airman Jason D. Cunningham

75th Ranger Regiment:

- Corporal Matthew A. Commons
- Sergeant Bradley S. Crose
- Specialist Marc A. Anderson

160th Special Operations Aviation Regiment (Airborne):

- Sergeant Philip "Spytech" Svitak

==== Wounded ====
SEAL Team Six:

- Aviation Boatswain's Mate 1st Class Stephen "Turbo" Toboz Jr., wounded in the left lower leg.
- Electronics Technician 2nd Class Brett Morganti, wounded in both legs.

160th Special Operations Aviation Regiment (Airborne):

- Chief Warrant Officer Donald Tabron, wounded by a single gunshot wound in the index finger.
- Sergeant First Class Cory Lamoreaux, wounded by a single gunshot wound in the abdomen.
- Staff Sergeant David Dube, wounded by a single gunshot wound in the left leg.
- Chief Warrant Officer Greg Calvert, wounded by small arms fire to the left arm and hand, and RPG shrapnel to both legs.
- Chief Warrant Officer Chuck Gant, wounded by heavy machine gun fire to the left leg.

75th Ranger Regiment:

- Captain Nate Self, wounded by RPG fragments.
- Staff Sergeant Ray DePouli, wounded by RPG fragments.
- Private First Class David Gilliam, wounded by RPG fragments.
- Specialist Aaron Totten-Lancaster, wounded by RPG fragments.

USAF 17th Air Support Operations Squadron:

- Staff Sergeant Kevin Vance, wounded by RPG fragments.

== In popular culture ==
- The story of the 2010 video game Medal of Honor is based on the Battle of Takur Ghar with the character "Rabbit" loosely based on Neil "Fifi" C. Roberts.
- The captain in charge of Ranger Quick Reaction Force (QRF) on MH-47 call sign Razor 01, Nate Self, was dubbed a hero and was subsequently interviewed regarding both the battle and development of PTSD as a result of the incidents. He has written a book entitled "Two Wars" which details his experiences.
- The battle is depicted in an episode of the Situation Critical series, as well as the History Channel series The Warfighters.
- On October 6, 2025, it was announced Adam Driver will portray Chapman in an upcoming movie about Chapman and the Battle of Takur Ghar.
