= Britt K. Slabinski =

United States Navy Medal of Honor recipient (born 1969)

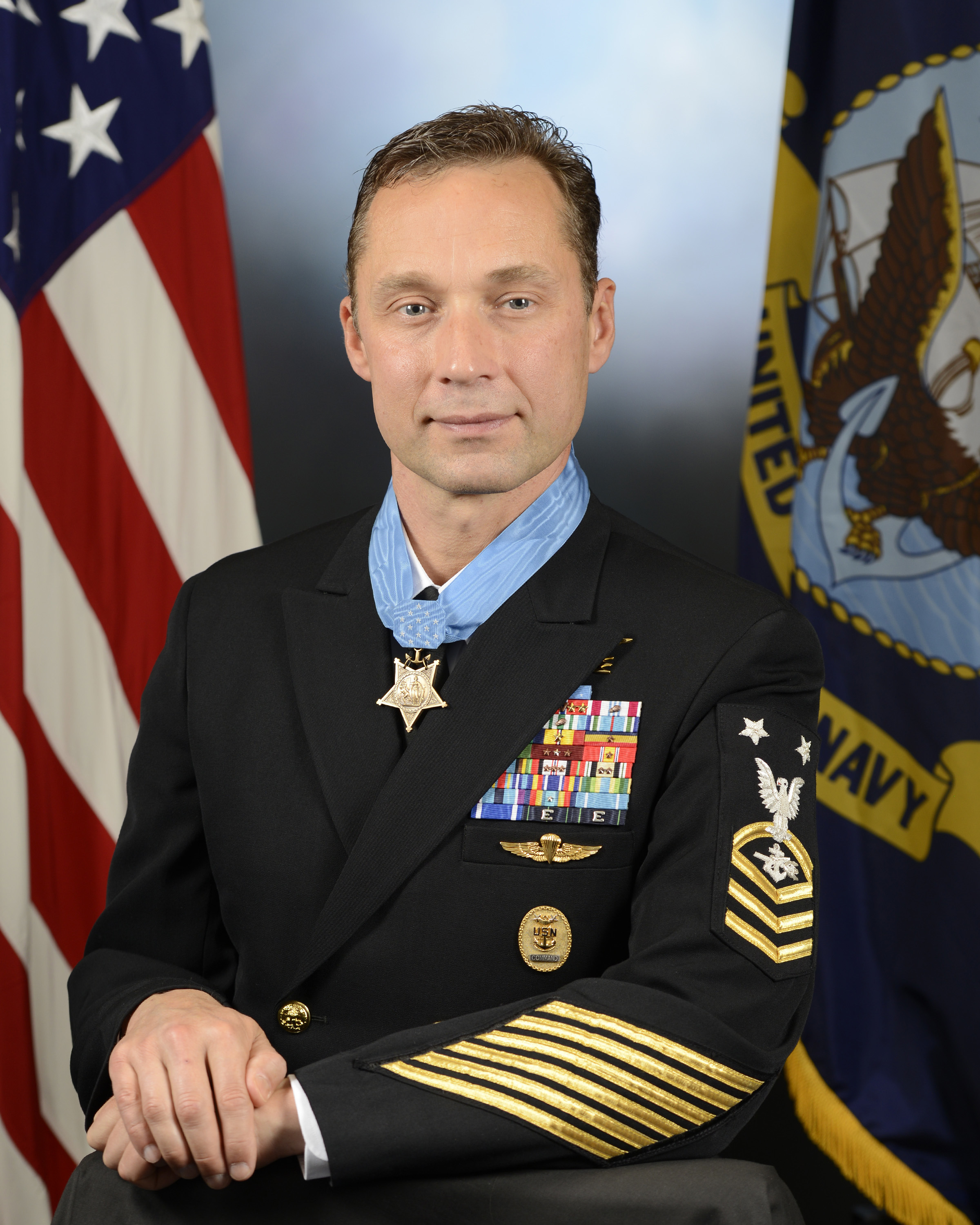
- Official portrait of SOCM Slabinski in May 2018 (Age 48)
- Born: December 1, 1969 (age 56); Northampton, Massachusetts, U.S.
- Relatives: 1 son
- Military career
- Allegiance: United States
- Branch: United States Navy
- Service years: 1988–2014
- Rank: Master chief special warfare operator
- Units: U.S. Navy SEALs: SEAL Team 4; SEAL Team Six
- Conflicts: War in Afghanistan; Operation Anaconda; Battle of Takur Ghar; Iraq War
- Awards: Medal of Honor; Navy and Marine Corps Medal; Bronze Star Medal with V (5)

Britt Kelly Slabinski (born December 1, 1969) is a retired United States Navy SEAL who received the Medal of Honor on May 24, 2018, for his actions during the Battle of Takur Ghar. He also participated in the highly publicized rescue mission to recover Army PFC Jessica Lynch.

== Early life and education ==
Slabinski is from Northampton, Massachusetts. He earned the rank of Eagle Scout at age 14 on March 9, 1984. He graduated from Smith Vocational and Agricultural High School in 1988.

== Career ==
In 1988, Slabinski enlisted in the U.S. Navy. He attended boot camp in Orlando, Florida. Upon completion, he received orders to attend Radioman Class "A" School in San Diego, California. There, he trained on the basics of naval communications, graduating in spring 1989. He qualified and was accepted into Basic Underwater Demolition/SEAL training (BUD/S) at Naval Amphibious Base Coronado. Slabinski graduated with BUD/S class 164 in January 1990. Following SEAL Tactical Training (STT) and completion of six month probationary period, he received the NEC 5326 as a Combatant Swimmer (SEAL), entitled to wear the Special Warfare Insignia.

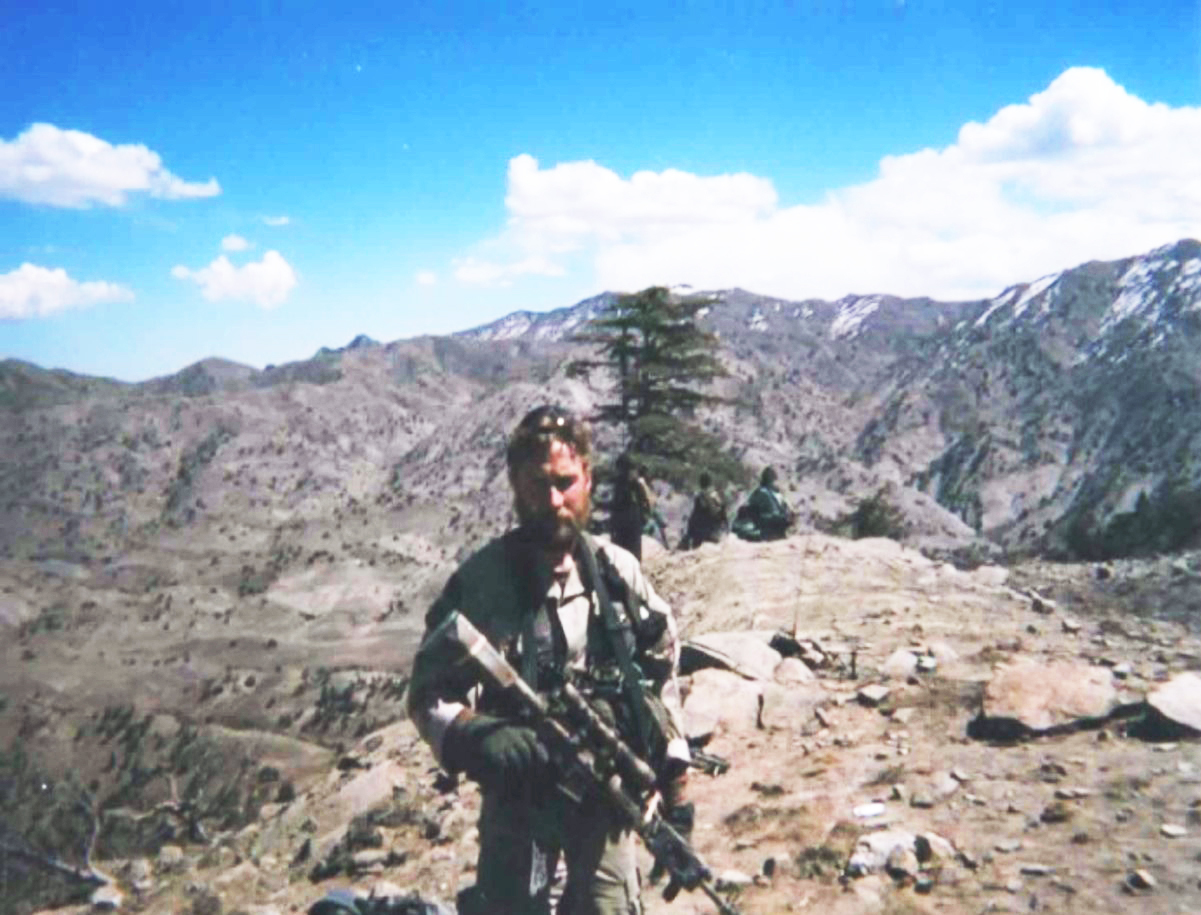
Slabinski on Roberts Ridge (Takur Ghar) in March 2002 (Age 32/33)

Slabinski's operational assignments include SEAL Team Four, 1990 to 1993; Naval Special Warfare Development Group (NSWDG), 1993 to 2006; and Command Master Chief of Naval Special Warfare Tactical Development and Evaluation Squadron Two, 2006 to 2008. He was the Senior Enlisted Advisor of the Joint Special Operations Command, Washington, DC Office, 2008 to 2010 and Command Master Chief, Naval Special Warfare Group Two, 2010 to 2012.

Slabinski completed nine overseas deployments and 15 combat deployments in support of the global war on terrorism, including Operations Enduring Freedom and Iraqi Freedom. He retired in June 2014 as the Director of Naval Special Warfare Safety Assurance and Analysis Program after more than 25 years of service.

== Awards and decorations ==
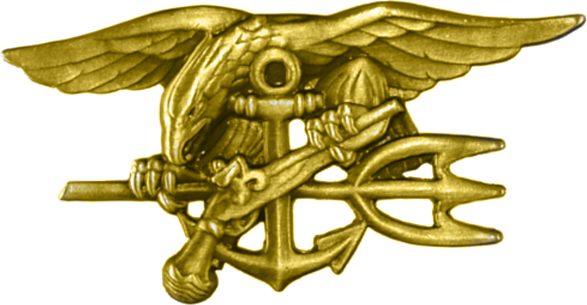

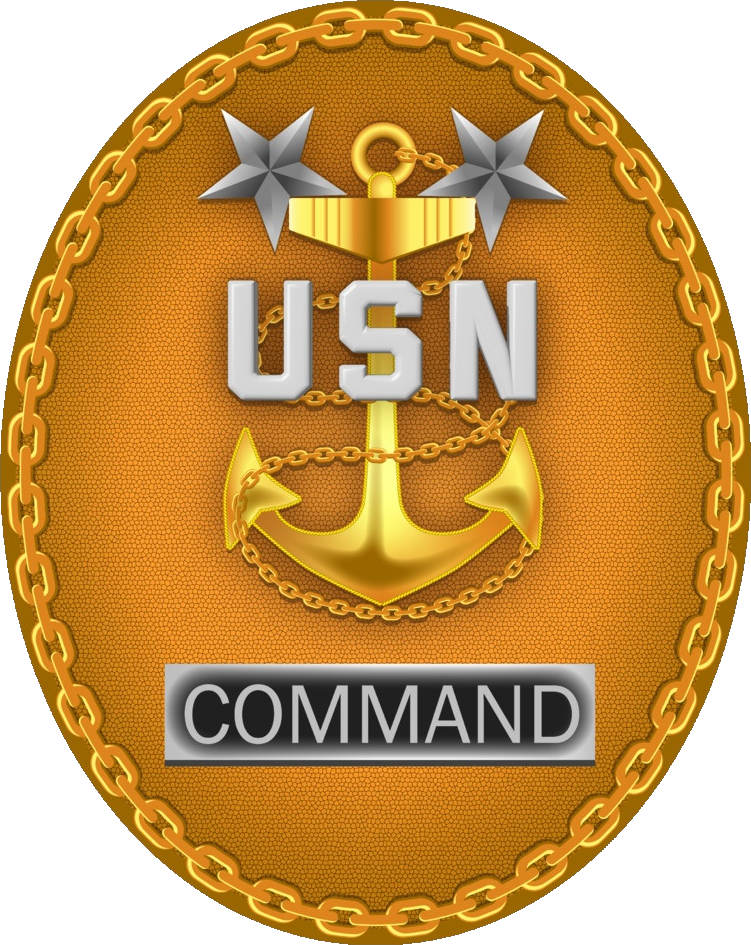

Badge	Special Warfare insignia		
1st row		Medal of Honor	
2nd row	Navy and Marine Corps Medal	Bronze Star w/ Combat V and four gold 5/16 inch award stars	Defense Meritorious Service Medal with one bronze oak leaf cluster
3rd row	Meritorious Service Medal with award star	Joint Service Commendation Medal with oak leaf cluster	Joint Service Achievement Medal
4th row	Navy Achievement Medal with award star	Combat Action Ribbon with award star	Navy Presidential Unit Citation with one bronze 3/16 service star
5th row	Navy Meritorious Unit Commendation	Navy Good Conduct Medal with one silver and two bronze 3/16 service stars	National Defense Service Medal with 3/16 service stars
6th row	Armed Forces Expeditionary Medal with service star	Afghanistan Campaign Medal with three 3/16 service stars	Iraq Campaign Medal with two 3/16 service stars
7th row	Global War on Terrorism Expeditionary Medal	Global War on Terrorism Service Medal	Armed Forces Service Medal
8th row	Humanitarian Service Medal	Sea Service Deployment Ribbon with silver 3/16 service star	United Nations Medal
9th row	NATO Medal for the former Yugoslavia	Navy Expert Rifleman Medal	Navy Expert Pistol Shot Medal
Badge	Naval Parachutist Badge		
Badge	Navy "COMMAND MASTER CHIEF" gold badge		

- Six gold Service stripes.

== Medal of Honor citation ==
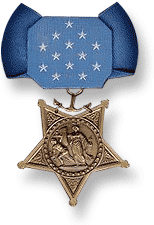

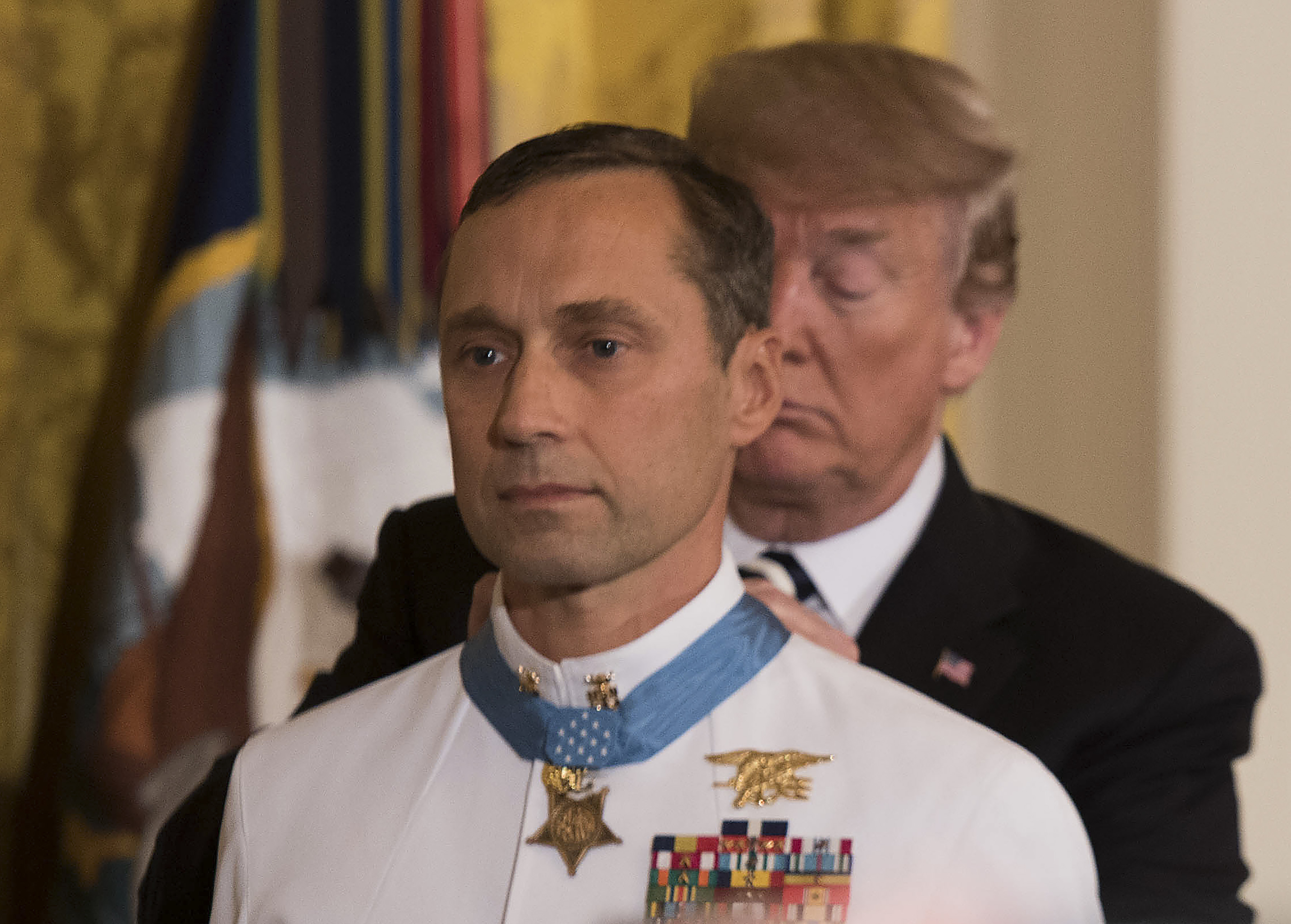
Slabinski receives the Medal of Honor from president Donald Trump in 2018

The March 2002 ambush that resulted in Slabinski's heroic actions (now known as the Battle of Takur Ghar) was described as one of the most savage and controversial battles of the Afghan war. The Medal of Honor awarded Slabinski is an upgrade from the Navy Cross award he previously received.

In 2018, for his heroism during the same battle, TSgt John Chapman was posthumously awarded the Medal of Honor.

Britt Slabinski

Senior Chief Petty Officer, United States Navy

For Services as Set Forth in the Following

For conspicuous gallantry and intrepidity at the risk of his life above and beyond the call of duty while assigned to a Joint Task Force in support of Operation ENDURING FREEDOM. In the early morning of 4 March 2002, Senior Chief Special Warfare Operator Slabinski led a reconnaissance team to its assigned area atop a 10,000-foot snow-covered mountain. Their insertion helicopter was suddenly riddled with rocket-propelled grenades and small arms fire from previously undetected enemy positions. The crippled helicopter lurched violently and ejected one teammate onto the mountain before the pilots were forced to crash land in the valley far below. Senior Chief Slabinski boldly rallied his five remaining team members and marshalled supporting assets for an assault to rescue their stranded teammate. During reinsertion the team came under fire from three directions, and one teammate started moving uphill toward an enemy strongpoint. Without regard for his own safety, Senior Chief Slabinski charged directly toward enemy fire to join his teammate. Together, they fearlessly assaulted and cleared the first bunker they encountered. The enemy then unleashed a hail of machine gun fire from a second hardened position only twenty meters away. Senior Chief Slabinski repeatedly exposed himself to deadly fire to personally engage the second enemy bunker and orient his team's fires in the furious, close-quarters firefight. Proximity made air support impossible, and after several teammates became casualties, the situation became untenable. Senior Chief Slabinski maneuvered his team to a more defensible position, directed air strikes in very close proximity to his team's position, and requested reinforcements. As daylight approached, accurate enemy mortar fire forced the team further down the sheer mountainside. Senior Chief Slabinski carried a seriously wounded teammate through deep snow and led a difficult trek across precipitous terrain while calling in fire on the enemy, which was engaging the team from the surrounding ridges. Throughout the next 14 hours, Senior Chief Slabinski stabilized the casualties and continued the fight against the enemy until the hill was secured and his team was extracted. By his undaunted courage, bold initiative, leadership, and devotion to duty, Senior Chief Slabinski reflected great credit upon himself and upheld the highest traditions of the United States Naval Service.

The new Medal of Honor Museum opening in Arlington, Texas has an exhibit dedicated to Britt Slabinski.

== Personal life ==
Slabinski has an Emergency Medical Technician/Paramedic National Certification. He is self-employed as a corporate consultant. He has one son, who is also an Eagle Scout and Ohio State graduate.

Slabinski appeared in the Spring 2019 issue of the American Battlefield Trust's magazine Hallowed Ground, writing about his visit to the Fredericksburg and Spotsylvania National Military Park.
