= Takur Ghar =

Mountain in Afghanistan

Highest point
- Elevation: 3,191 m (10,469 ft)
- Coordinates: 33°20′32″N 69°12′50″E

Naming
- Native name: كوۀ تاكر (Pashto)

Geography
- Location: Southeastern Afghanistan
- Province: Paktia
- Parent range: Arma Mountains

Takur Ghar (Pashto: ټاکور غر) is a high mountain located in the Arma Mountains of southeastern Afghanistan. The peak is on the eastern border of the Shah-i-Kot Valley.

The peak of Takur Ghar was the location of fierce fighting between US Special Operations Forces and al-Qaeda insurgents, as well as Taliban fighters, during Operation Anaconda in March 2002 as part of the larger US war in Afghanistan.

Takur Ghar is featured in the 2010 first-person shooter video game Medal of Honor.

The mountain is the main setting in the upcoming 2027 American film, Alone at Dawn.
