= Nate Self =

Recipient of the Purple Heart medal

- Born: 1976 (age 49–50); Waco, Texas, U.S.
- Military career
- Allegiance: United States
- Branch: United States Army
- Service years: 1998–2004
- Rank: Captain
- Units: Scout Platoon, HHC, 2/2 Infantry; 1st Platoon, A Company, 1st Ranger Battalion, 75th Ranger Regiment; 101st Airborne Division
- Conflicts: Operation Joint Guardian Operation Enduring Freedom – Afghanistan: Battle of Takur Ghar; 2003 Invasion of Iraq
- Awards: Silver Star; Bronze Star; Purple Heart

Nathan E. Self (born 1976) is an American author and former United States Army officer.

== Early life and education ==
From China Spring, Texas, Self graduated from West Point in 1998. At West Point, he was part of the lightweight football team.

== Career ==
After commissioning as an infantry officer in 1998, Self deployed to Kosovo with 2nd Battalion, 2nd Infantry Regiment of the 1st Infantry Division, and was then selected to serve in the 75th Ranger Regiment. As platoon leader of 1st Platoon, A Company, 1st Ranger Battalion, 75th Ranger Regiment, he deployed to Afghanistan shortly after 9/11 as part of a Special Operations task force with a mission to kill or capture Taliban and al-Qaeda's top leaders. Self commanded a Quick Reaction Force to rescue a missing Navy SEAL during the Battle of Takur Ghar mountain. For his actions during the battle he was awarded the Silver Star and Bronze Star, and a Purple Heart and was invited to attend the 2003 State of the Union Address. Following a tour in Iraq with the 101st Airborne Division, where he wrote and directed daily operations and trained Iraqi Security Forces, Nate commanded a rifle company before leaving the Army in 2004.

Since leaving the army, Self went on to co-found a leadership development company in 2006 that worked closely with the US Army named "The Praevius Group" where he leads as a key partner.

Self has also written about his experiences in Afghanistan and his struggle with PTSD in his autobiography entitled Two Wars in 2009.

== Silver Star ==
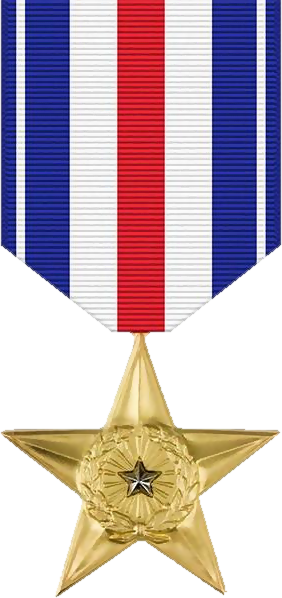

Citation:

The President of the United States of America, authorized by Act of Congress July 9, 1918 (amended by an act of July 25, 1963), takes pleasure in presenting the Silver Star to Captain (Infantry) Nathan E. Self, United States Army, for conspicuous gallantry and intrepidity in action while serving as Platoon Leader in Company A, 1st Battalion, 75th Ranger Regiment, during combat operations in support of Operation ENDURING FREEDOM, during the period 3 to 4 March 2002, during Operation ANACONDA, in Afghanistan. Captain Self's valorous actions while in direct contact with enemy forces and in the face of extreme duress during the successful rescue of Special Operators contributed immeasurably to the success of the mission and the saving of additional lives. While exiting the aircraft, Captain Self was severely wounded in the thigh. With total Disregard for his well being, he fought to the first covered and concealed position, engaged the enemy with his weapon, gathering remaining combat effective Rangers, and began calling close air support on enemy locations. The gallantry displayed by Captain Self during 18 hours of combat is in keeping with the highest standards of valor. Through his distinctive accomplishments, Captain Self reflected credit upon himself, the United States Army, and the Department of Defense.
