= Saif-ur-Rehman Mansoor =

Afghan military commander

Maulvi Saif-ur Mansur
- Nicknames: Saifullah Rahman Mansour, Saifullah Rehman Mansoor
- Died: January 2008
- Allegiance: Taliban
- Rank: Senior Commander
- Commands: Deputy commander of the Taliban's garrison at Kargha
- Conflicts: Soviet occupation of Afghanistan, American invasion of Afghanistan, Battle of Takur Ghar

Maulvi Saif-ur Mansur (also Saifullah Rahman Mansour, Saifullah Rehman Mansoor; died c. January 2008) was a senior Taliban commander.

Saifullah's father, Nasrullah Mansur, had been one of the leading militia commanders who fought against the Soviet Union during the Soviet occupation of Afghanistan.

Prior to the American invasion of Afghanistan Saifullah was the deputy commander of the Taliban's garrison at Kargha, on the outskirts of Kabul.

He fled to Pakistan following the deposition of the Taliban in late 2001, and was reported to have rallied 1,000 fighters by March 2002. Saifullah was reported by Pajhwok Afghan News to have said "The fight against America for the supremacy of Islam and the defense of our country will continue until our last breath".

In May 2002 Time magazine described Saifullah as an emerging hero in the Taliban, after his men destroyed an American helicopter, killing seven American soldiers, in the Battle of Takur Ghar in Paktia Province. Quoting a former Taliban diplomat, the magazine described Saifullah as "a pious and emotional man of limited education and vision, naive and easily misled."

In 2005 Pakistani officials offered contradictory comments about whether Saifullah was still alive.

Saifullah was killed in combat in January 2008, according to Pajhwok Afghan News, quoting a source in the National Intelligence Department.

The Indian press reported that a militant seized in disputed Kashmir in November 2010 asserted that Saifullah Mansur had been the "masool" or leader in Pakistan's Sarhad Province.
