= Arma Mountains =

Mountain range in Afghanistan

The Arma Mountains (Pashto: د ارما غرونه) are a mountain range in the Zurmat District of the Paktia province of Afghanistan.
