= Rob Furlong =

Canadian former military sniper (born 1976)

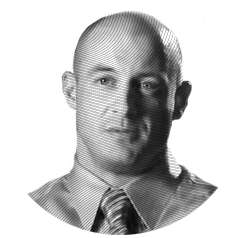
- Born: 11 November 1976 (age 49); Fogo Island, Newfoundland, Canada
- Military career
- Allegiance: Canada
- Branch: Canadian Army
- Service years: 1997–2004
- Rank: Corporal
- Unit: Princess Patricia's Canadian Light Infantry
- Conflicts: War in Afghanistan: Operation Anaconda
- Awards: Bronze Star Medal (United States)
- Other work: Edmonton Police Service

Rob Furlong (born 11 November 1976) is a Canadian former military sniper who, from March 2002 until November 2009, held the world record for the longest confirmed sniper kill in combat, at 2,430 m (2,657 yd). His record stood for over seven years until surpassed by British soldier Craig Harrison with a distance of 2,475 m (2,707 yd).

== Early life ==
Born on Fogo Island, Newfoundland, on 11 November 1976. In his early life Furlong taught himself to fire a rifle ambidextrously.

== Military career ==
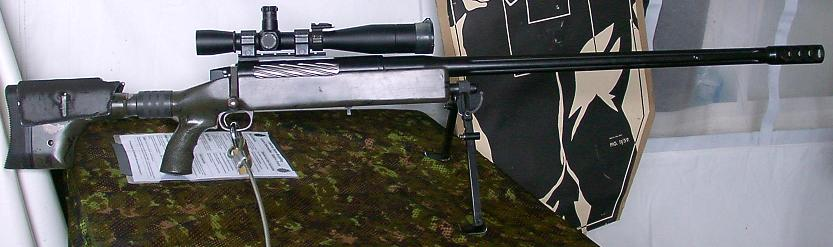
The rifle Furlong used to kill an enemy from 2,430 m.

Inspired by a VHS tape, Furlong decided to join the military in 1997. Furlong enlisted in the Canadian Army and served with the 3rd Battalion, Princess Patricia's Canadian Light Infantry. Furlong was stationed in Bosnia in 1999 as a peace keeper.

In March 2002, Furlong participated in Operation Anaconda in Afghanistan's Shah-i-Kot Valley. His sniper team included Master Corporal Graham Ragsdale (Team Commander), Master Corporal Tim McMeekin, Master Corporal Arron Perry, and Corporal Dennis Eason. A group of three Al-Qaeda fighters were moving into a mountainside position when Furlong took aim with his weapon, a .50 BMG McMillan TAC-50, loaded with Hornady A-MAX 750 gr very-low-drag bullets. He began firing at a fighter carrying an RPK machine gun. Furlong's first shot missed and his second shot hit the knapsack on the target's back. The third struck the target's torso, killing him. The distance was measured as 2,430 metres (2,657 yd). With a muzzle speed of 823 metres per second (2,700 ft/s), each shot reached the target almost three seconds after Furlong fired. This became the longest sniper kill in history at the time, surpassing the previous record set by his teammate, Master Corporal Arron Perry, by 120 metres (130 yd).

This feat is not typical for the effective range with a high first-hit probability of the employed rifle on non-static targets (see Sniper rifle#Maximum effective range). The shot was aided by the ambient air density in the Shah-i-Kot Valley where Furlong operated, which is significantly lower than at sea level due to its 2,700 metres (9,000 ft) mean elevation.

In December 2003, PPCLI snipers Master Corporal Graham Ragsdale, Master Corporal Tim McMeekin, Corporal Dennis Eason, Corporal Rob Furlong and Master Corporal Arron Perry were awarded the Bronze Star Medal by the United States Army for their actions in combat during Operation Anaconda from 2–11 March 2002. Furlong held the record of longest kill shot recorded in history until November 2009, when his record of 2,430 metres (2,657 yd) was beaten by British Army soldier Craig Harrison, who set a new record by shooting two Taliban fighters at 2,475 metres (2,707 yd).

== Later career ==
After leaving the Canadian Army, Furlong moved to Edmonton, Alberta and joined the Edmonton Police Service in 2004. In 2012, Furlong was dismissed from the police for discreditable conduct, after an episode in which he physically abused and urinated on a fellow police officer. In 2013, he opened a marksmanship academy, Rob Furlong's Marksmanship Academy, headquartered in Edmonton.

== See also ==
- Longest recorded sniper kills
- List of books, articles and documentaries about snipers

Records
Preceded by Arron Perry	Longest confirmed combat sniper-shot kill 2002–2009; 2,430 m (2,660 yd; 1.51 mi) long-range sniper weapon (LRSW) w/ Hornady A-MAX .50	Succeeded by Craig Harrison
