= Longest recorded sniper kills =

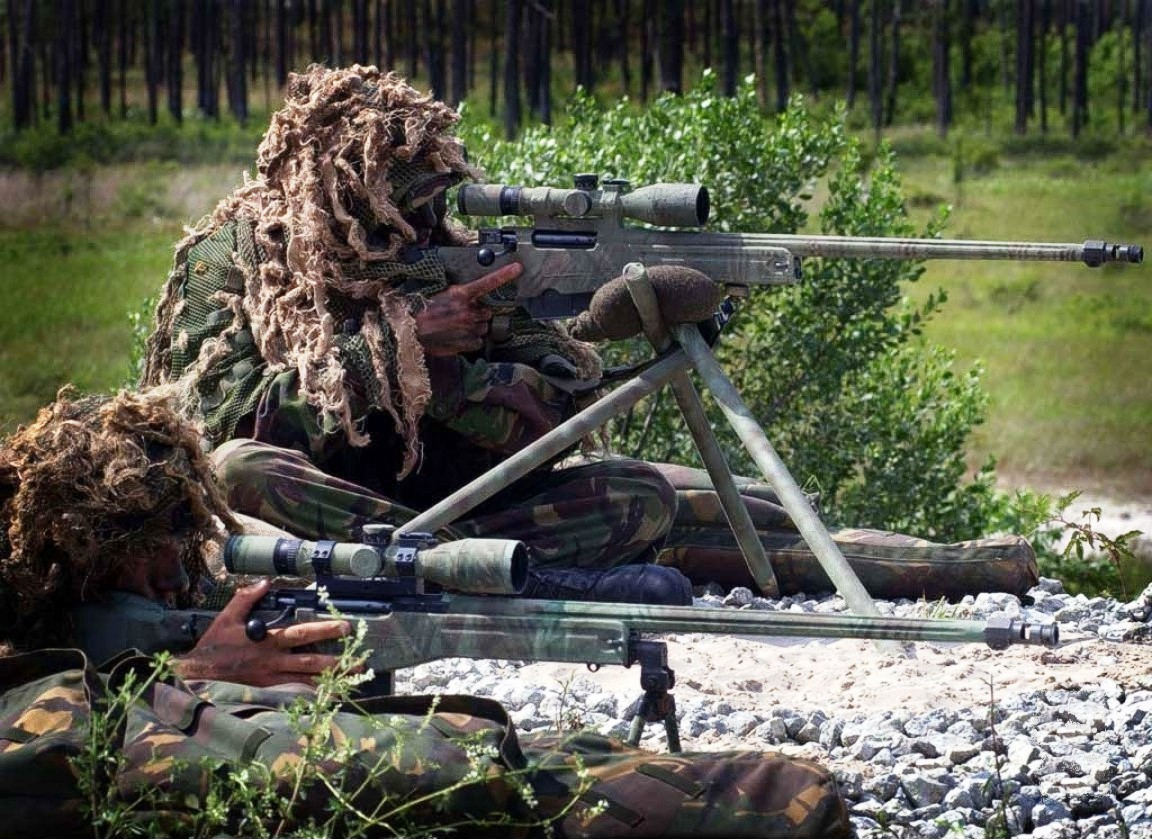
Royal Marines snipers with Accuracy International L115A1 rifles. These rifles are similar to the L115A3 Long Range Rifle used by Craig Harrison but outfitted with Schmidt & Bender 3-12x50 PM II telescopic sights.

Reports regarding the longest recorded sniper kills that contain information regarding the shooting distance and the identity of the sniper have been presented to the general public since 1967. Snipers have had a substantial history following the development of long distance weaponry. As weapons, ammunition, and aids to determine ballistic solutions improved, so too did the distance from which a kill could be targeted. In mid-2017 it was reported that an unnamed Canadian special forces operator, based in Iraq, had set a new record of 3,540 m (3,871 yd), beating the record previously held by an Australian sniper (also unnamed) at 2,815 m (3,079 yd). In November 2023, the record was once again broken by 58-year old sniper Viacheslav Kovalskyi of the Security Service of Ukraine, who shot a Russian soldier from a distance of 3,800 m (4,156 yd) during the Russo-Ukrainian war.

== Sniper technology ==
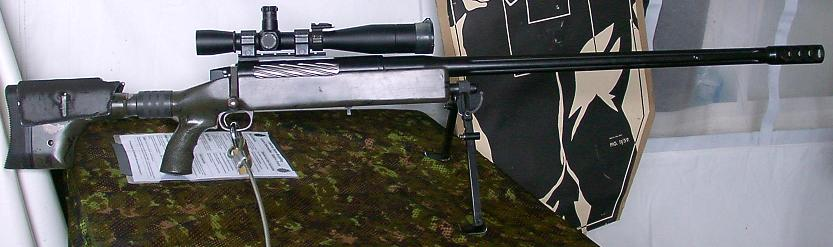
The McMillan TAC-50 rifle used by Canadian Army Corporal Rob Furlong.

Although optical equipment such as rangefinders and ballistic calculators have largely eliminated manual calculations to determine elevation and windage, the fundamentals of accurate and precise long-range shooting remain essentially the same since the early history of shooting, and the skill and training of the shooter, and the shooter's spotter where applicable, are the primary factors. Accuracy and precision of ammunition and firearms still rely on human factors.

The modern method of long-distance sniping (shots over 1,100 m or 1,203 yd) requires intense training and practice. A sniper must have the ability to accurately estimate the various factors that influence a bullet's trajectory and point of impact, such as the shooter's distance from the target, wind direction, wind speed, air density, elevation, and even the Coriolis effect. Mistakes in estimation compound over distance and can cause a shot to only injure, or to miss completely. Any given combination of firearm and ammunition will have an associated value, known as the circular error probable (CEP), defined as the radius of a circle whose boundary is expected to contain the impact points of half of the rounds fired.

If the shooter wishes to improve accuracy, increase range, or both, the accuracy of estimates of external factors must improve accordingly. At extreme ranges, highly accurate estimates are required and even with the most accurate estimates, hitting the target becomes subject to uncontrollable factors. For example, a rifle capable of firing a ½ or 0.5 MOA (approximately 0.5 inch center to center of the two holes furthest apart) 5-round group (often referred to as "grouping") at 100 yards will theoretically fire a 12.5 inch group at 2,500 yards (0.5 × 2,500/100 = 12.5). Unless the group is centered perfectly on the target at 100 yards, the 2,500-yard group will be centered 25 times the off-center error at 100 yards. This example ignores all other factors and assumes no-wind shooting conditions, identical muzzle velocities, and identical ballistic performance for each shot.

Devices such as laser rangefinders, handheld meteorological measuring equipment, handheld computers, and ballistic-prediction software can contribute to increased accuracy (i.e. reduced CEP), although they rely on proper use and training to realize any advantages. In addition, as instruments of measure, they are subject to accuracy errors and malfunction. Handheld meteorological instruments only measure conditions at the location they are used. Wind direction and speed can vary dramatically along the path of the bullet.

== History ==
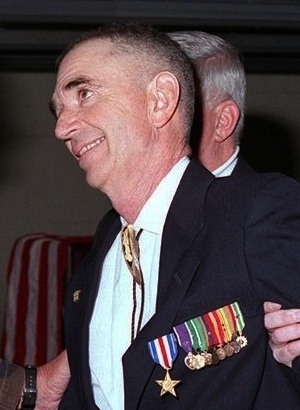
Gunnery Sergeant Carlos Hathcock in 1996

The longest confirmed kill in World War II was by German sniper Matthäus Hetzenauer at 1,100 metres (1,200 yd).

The science of long-range sniping came to fruition in the Vietnam War. US Marine Gunnery Sergeant Carlos Hathcock held the record from 1967 to 2002 at 2,286 m (2,500 yd). He recorded 93 official kills. After returning to the US, Hathcock helped to establish the Marine Corps Scout Sniper School at Quantico, Virginia.

In addition to his success as a USMC scout-sniper during multiple deployments to Vietnam, Hathcock competed in multiple USMC shooting teams. Hathcock also won the 1966 Wimbledon Cup, which is earned by the winner of the US 1,000-yard high-powered rifle National Championship. Even after being severely burned during an attack on an Amtrac on which he was riding in his efforts to rescue other Marines, which earned him a Silver Star, and after being diagnosed with multiple sclerosis, Hathcock continued to serve, shoot and instruct. In Vietnam, Hathcock also completed missions involving a "through the scope" shot which killed an enemy sniper specifically hunting him, and a multiple-day solo stalk and kill of an enemy general.

Hathcock's record stood until Canadian sniper Arron Perry of Princess Patricia's Canadian Light Infantry exceeded it with a shot of 2,310 m (2,530 yd). Perry held the title for only a few days, as another man in his unit, Corporal Rob Furlong, beat Perry's distance with a 2,430 m (2,657 yd) shot in March 2002. Perry and Furlong were part of a six-man sniper team during 2002's Operation Anaconda, part of the War in Afghanistan.

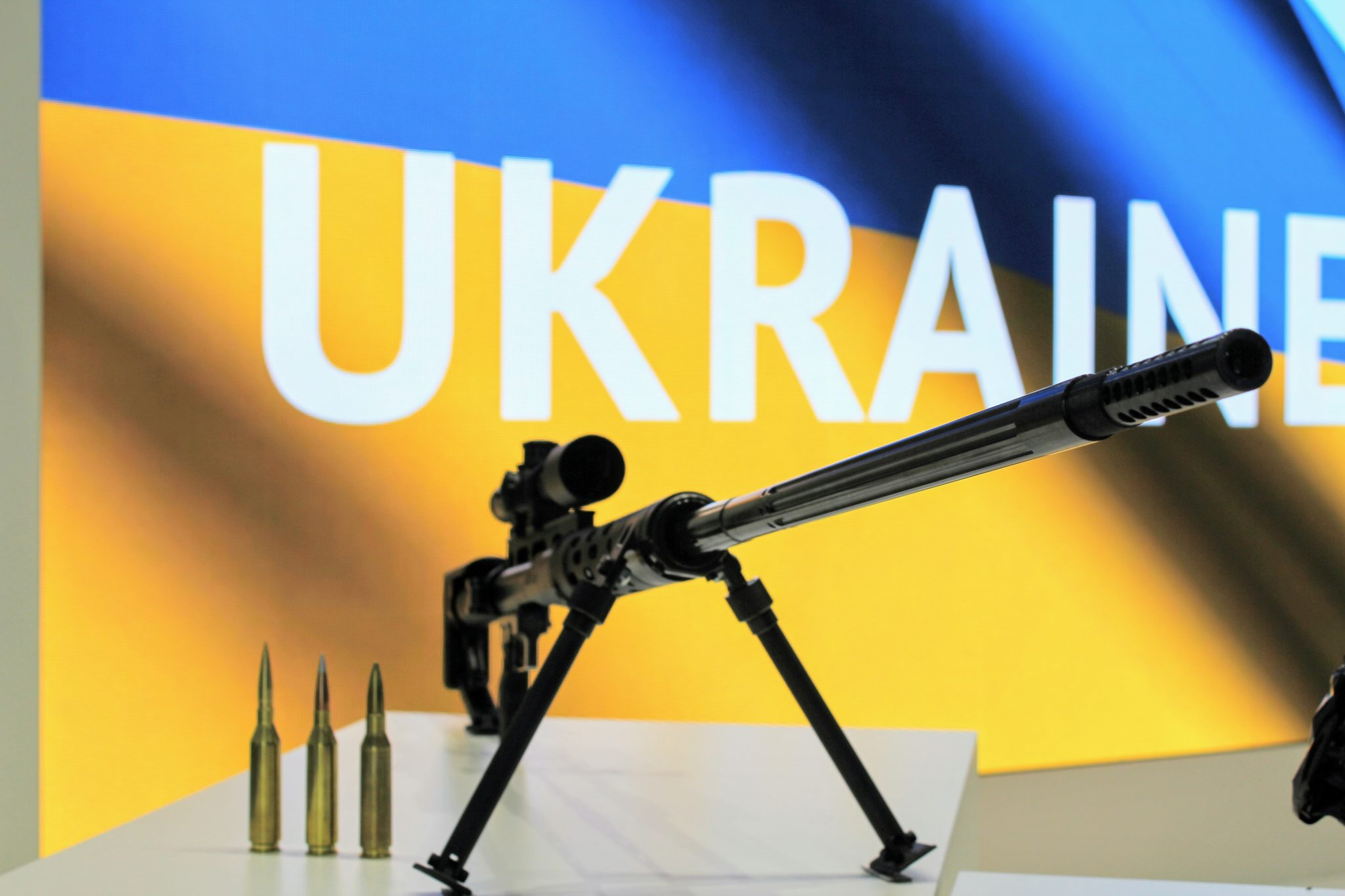
A Horizon's Lord rifle, as used by Ukrainian sniper Viacheslav Kovalskyi.

Corporal Furlong's record was bested by a British soldier, Corporal of Horse Craig Harrison, of the Blues and Royals, Household Cavalry, who recorded two consecutive 2,475 m (2,707 yd) shots (confirmed by GPS) in November 2009, also during the War in Afghanistan, in which he hit two Taliban insurgents consecutively. Harrison killed the two Taliban machine gunners with shots that took the 8.59 mm (0.338 inch) rounds almost five seconds to hit their targets, which were 900 m (980 yd) beyond the L115A3 sniper rifle's recommended range. A third shot took out the insurgents' machine gun. The rifle used was made by Accuracy International.

Harrison's record was surpassed in 2012 by an unnamed Australian sniper, also during the war in Afghanistan, though this was not widely reported.

In June 2017, an unnamed sniper from Canadian special forces unit, Joint Task Force 2, surpassed the 2012 record by nearly 800 m (870 yd), with a 3,540 m (3,871 yd) shot in the Iraqi Civil War. As with the previous two Canadian records, a McMillan TAC-50 with .50 BMG ammunition was used.

In November 2023, during the Russian invasion of Ukraine, a special agent with the Security Service of Ukraine, later revealed to be 58-year-old sniper Viacheslav Kovalsky, surpassed the previous world record by shooting a Russian soldier from a distance of 3,800 m (4,156 yd). The sniper used a Ukrainian-made, multi-caliber anti-materiel sniper rifle named Volodar Obriyu (Horizon's Lord). The ammunition used was a newly developed .50 caliber round named 12.7×114 mm HL, which was made by necking down a 14.5×114 mm case.

== Confirmed kills 1,250 m (1,370 yd) or greater ==
This list is not exhaustive, as such data is generally not tracked nor managed under any official procedure. For example, the 2002 Canadian Army sniper team that saw two soldiers set consecutive new records (Arron Perry at 2,310 m (2,526 yd) and Rob Furlong at 2,430 m (2,657 yd)), also made a number of kills at 1,500 m (1,600 yd) that are not counted here. The list also shows that, in some cases, an armed force command may choose to withhold the name of the sniper for security reasons.

Rank	Sniper	Date	Distance	Weapon	Ammunition	Nationality	Military unit	Conflict	References
1	(name withheld)	August 2025	4,000 m (4,374 yd)	XADO Snipex Alligator	14.5×114mm	Ukraine	"Pryvyd" (Ghost) sniper unit	Russian invasion of Ukraine	
2	Viacheslav Kovalskyi	November 2023	3,800 m (4,156 yd)	Horizon's Lord	12.7×114 mm HL	Ukraine	Special Group "Alpha", Security Service of Ukraine	Russian invasion of Ukraine	
3	(name withheld)	May 2017	3,540 m (3,871 yd)	McMillan TAC-50	.50 BMG	Canada	Joint Task Force 2, CANSOFCOM, Canadian Armed Forces	War in Iraq	
4	(name withheld)	April 2012	2,815 m (3,079 yd)	Barrett M82A1	.50 BMG (Raufoss Mk 211)	Australia	2nd Commando Regiment, SOCOMD, Australian Defence Force	War in Afghanistan	
5	(name withheld)	November 2022	2,710 m (2,964 yd)	XADO Snipex Alligator	14.5×114mm	Ukraine	Ukrainian National Guard, Ministry of Internal Affairs	Russian invasion of Ukraine	
6	Corporal of Horse Craig Harrison	November 2009	2,475 m (2,707 yd)	Accuracy International L115A3	.338 Lapua Magnum (LockBase B408)	United Kingdom	Blues and Royals, Household Cavalry, British Army	War in Afghanistan	
7	Corporal Rob Furlong	March 2002	2,430 m (2,657 yd)	McMillan TAC-50	.50 BMG	Canada	3rd Battalion, Princess Patricia's Canadian Light Infantry, Canadian Armed Forces	War in Afghanistan	
8	Master Corporal Arron Perry	March 2002	2,310 m (2,526 yd)	McMillan TAC-50	.50 BMG	Canada	3rd Battalion, Princess Patricia's Canadian Light Infantry, Canadian Armed Forces	War in Afghanistan	
9	Sergeant Brian Kremer	October 2004	2,300 m (2,515 yd)	Barrett M82A1	.50 BMG (Raufoss Mk 211)	United States	2nd Battalion, 75th Ranger Regiment, United States Army	Iraq War	
10	Gunnery Sergeant Carlos Hathcock	February 1967	2,286 m (2,500 yd)	M2 Browning machine gun	.50 BMG (Note: Longest confirmed kill using non-match grade ammunition.)	United States	7th Marine Regiment, 1st Marine Division, United States Marine Corps	Vietnam War	
11	(name withheld)	August 2013	2,125 m (2,324 yd)	Denel NTW-14.5	14.5×114mm	South Africa	South African Special Forces Brigade, Joint Operations Division, SANDF	MONUSCO	
12	Specialist Nicholas Ranstad	January 2008	2,092 m (2,288 yd)	Barrett M82A1	.50 BMG	United States	1st Squadron, 91st Cavalry Regiment, United States Army	War in Afghanistan	
13	Chief Petty Officer Chris Kyle	August 2008	1,920 m (2,100 yd)	McMillan TAC-338	.338 Lapua Magnum	United States	SEAL Team 3, US Naval Special Warfare Command, United States Navy	Iraq War	
14	Corporal Christopher Reynolds	August 2009	1,853 m (2,026 yd)	Accuracy International L115A3	.338 Lapua Magnum (LockBase B408)	United Kingdom	The Black Watch (3 SCOT), Royal Regiment of Scotland, British Army	War in Afghanistan	
15	(name withheld)	January 2016	1,700 m (1,859 yd)	PGW Defence Technology LRT-3	.50 BMG	Saudi Arabia	Royal Saudi Land Forces, Armed Forces of Saudi Arabia	Yemeni Civil War	
16	Staff Sergeant Steve Reichert	April 2004	1,614 m (1,765 yd)	Barrett M82A3	.50 BMG (Raufoss Mk 211)	United States	2nd Battalion, 2nd Marine Regiment, United States Marine Corps	Iraq War	
17	Billy Dixon	June 1874	1,406 m (1,538 yd)	Sharps .50–90	.50-90 Sharps	United States	Civilian	American Indian Wars	
18	(name withheld)	November 2007	1,380 m (1,509 yd)	Barrett M82A1	.50 BMG (Raufoss Mk 211)	Norway	2nd Battalion, Norwegian Army	War in Afghanistan	
19	Sergeant Vladimir Ilyin	1985	1,350 m (1,476 yd)	Dragunov SVD	7.62×54mmR 7N1	Soviet Union	345th Independent Guards Airborne Regiment, Soviet Army	Soviet–Afghan War	
20	Sergeant First Class Brandon McGuire	April 2007	1,310 m (1,433 yd)	Barrett M82A1 (M107)	.50 BMG (Raufoss Mk 211)	United States	3rd Battalion, 509th Parachute Infantry Regiment, United States Army	Iraq War	
21	Sergeant Major Herbert Sleigh	February 1918	1,280 m (1,400 yd)	M1903 Springfield	.30-06 Springfield	United States	American Expeditionary Forces, United States Army	World War I	
22	Staff Sergeant Jim Gilliland	September 2005	1,250 m (1,367 yd)	M24 Sniper Weapon System	7.62×51 mm NATO	United States	2nd Battalion, 69th Armor Regiment, United States Army	Iraq War	

== See also ==
- List of snipers
- History of sniping
- Long range shooting
- Plunket's Shot

== Bibliography ==
- Brownlie, Robin (2003). A fatherly eye: Indian agents, government power, and Aboriginal resistance in Ontario, 1918–1939 (2003 ed.). University of Toronto Press. ISBN 978-0-19-541784-5.
- Bunch, Ashley (22 June 2017). "Canadian sniper crushes world record for longest confirmed kill in military history, reports say". Militarytimes.com a division of Sightline Media Group.
- Cannon, Chuck (19 April 2010). "Army sniper films spot for History channel based on 1,300 meter shot in Iraq". United States Armed Forces.
- Charleston Courier (6 December 1864). "Charleston Courier". Charleston Courier. ISSN 1061-5105.
- D'Alessio, Stephen (22 February 2005). "Marine Sniper Receives Bronze Star Medal for Valor". United States Marine Corps. Archived from the original on 3 December 2013.
- Evening Public Ledger (5 February 1918). "Johnstown Sammee First to Kill Hun". Evening Public Ledger. Philadelphia: Cyrus H. K. Curtis. pp. 1–16. ISSN 2151-3945. LCCN 83045211. OCLC 9355469.
- Fife, Robert (21 June 2017). "Canadian elite special forces sniper makes record-breaking kill shot in Iraq". The Globe and Mail.
- Fredriksen, John C. (2010). The United States Army: A Chronology, 1775 to the Present (2010 ed.). ABC-CLIO. ISBN 978-1-59884-344-6.
- Gibson, Erica (30 August 2013). "SA skerpskutter skiet doodskoot oor afstand van meer as 2 km" [SA sniper's kill shot from over 2km away]. Volksblad (in Afrikaans).
- Harnden, Toby (1 January 2006). "Sniper shot that took out an insurgent killer from three quarters of a mile". The Sunday Telegraph. London.
- Henderson, Charles (2003). Silent Warrior (2003 ed.). Berkley Books. ISBN 0-425-18864-7.
- Helfrich, Kim (30 August 2013). "SANDF mum about DRC sniper super shot". DefenceWeb.
- Masters, Chris (29 October 2012). "Taliban remain in fear of lethal strikes". Australian Daily Telegraph. Archived from the original on 15 June 2014.
- Jennings, Christian (17 August 2011). "Long range killer: Behind the scenes of Accuracy International". Wired.com.
- Johnsen, Nilas (7 October 2008). "Dreper fra 1380 meter" [Kills from 1380 meters]. Verdens Gang (in Norwegian).
- Jowett, Philip; Snodgrass, Brent (2006). Finland at War 1939–45. Elite 141 (2006 ed.). Osprey Publishing. ISBN 978-1-84176-969-1.
- Plaster, John L. (1993). The ultimate sniper: an advanced training manual for military & police snipers (1993 ed.). Paladin Press. ISBN 978-0-87364-704-5.
- Smith, Michael (2 May 2010). "Hotshot sniper in one-and-a-half mile double kill". The Sunday Times.
- Sohail (18 November 2015). "Soviet snipers in Afghanistan, 1979 – 1989 years". methgag.com.
- Souter, Gerry (2012). American Shooter: A Personal History of Gun Culture in the United States (2012 ed.). Potomac Books Inc. ISBN 9781597976909.
- Westwood, Dr. David (2005). Rifles: an illustrated history of their impact (2005 ed.). ABC-CLIO. ISBN 978-1-85109-401-1.
- Wahler, Glenn; Linwood, Russell (2014). One Shot Kills: A history of Australian Army sniping. Big Sky Publishing. ISBN 9781922132659.
