= Arron Perry =

Canadian sniper

- Military career
- Allegiance: Canada
- Branch: Canadian Army
- Rank: Master Corporal
- Units: Princess Louise Fusiliers; Princess Patricia's Canadian Light Infantry
- Conflicts: War in Afghanistan
- Awards: Bronze Star Medal (United States)

Arron Perry is a former master corporal in the Canadian Forces who in March 2002 broke the 34-year-old record for the longest recorded sniper kill in combat, completing a kill at a range of 2,310 metres (2,526 yd) during the War in Afghanistan. This shot exceeded the previous record of 2,286 m (2,500 yd), set by Carlos Hathcock in 1968 during the Vietnam War.

Perry's record was surpassed a few days later, in March 2002, when another soldier in his unit, Corporal Rob Furlong, bested Perry's distance with a kill at a verified range of 2,430 m (2,657 yd).

Perry was a member of Princess Patricia's Canadian Light Infantry at the time of the record shot, but began his military career with a Halifax Militia unit, the Princess Louise Fusiliers.

== Canadian sniper team ==
Perry was a member of a Canadian Forces-led six-man sniper team, operating as part of Canada's contributions to Operation Anaconda in Afghanistan during March 2002. The Canadian sniper cell consisted of two Sniper Detachments of three men each, with soldiers from the Princess Patricia's Canadian Light Infantry (PPCLI). Team Commander was Master Corporal Graham Ragsdale, joined by PPCLI soldiers Master Corporal Arron Perry (second in command), Master Corporal Tim McMeekin, Corporal Dennis Eason, Corporal Rob Furlong, and Corporal Marty, working with United States Army liaison Sergeant Zevon Durham.

The six worked in two teams of three snipers, built around two, .50-caliber, McMillan Brothers TAC-50 rifles (designated as the C15 long-range sniper weapon by the Canadian Forces). The lead shooters were Perry, for Alpha Detachment, and Furlong, for Bravo Detachment. Ragsdale and Eason worked predominantly as spotter and guard for Alpha, while McMeekin and Marty served those roles for Bravo—though details of how many sniper shots the rest of the team may also have taken have not been released.

The Canadian team received praise from United States Army colleagues for its extreme long range shots and for killing a significant number of Taliban and al-Qaeda combatants. When the operation ended, each of the Canadians were recommended for the United States Bronze Star Medal, which they received in December 2003 from Paul Cellucci, the American ambassador to Canada.

== Controversy ==
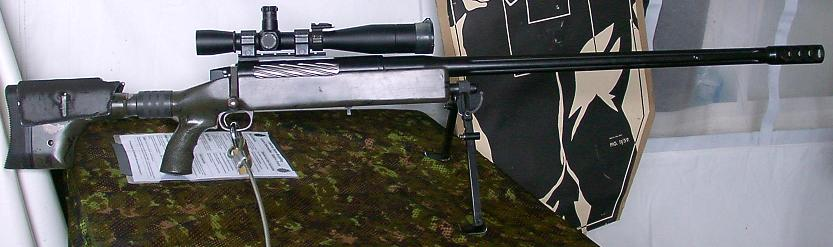
A McMillan Tac-50 rifle like Master Corporal Arron Perry used to kill an enemy combatant from 2,310 m (2,526 yd).

In 2002, Perry was accused of discreditable conduct by the Canadian Armed Forces. Forces personnel investigated allegations that he had desecrated a combatant's corpse by removing a finger, putting a cigarette in its mouth, and placing a sign reading "Fuck Terrorism" on its chest. Military police also suspected that Perry had defecated on another corpse. Ten months later the investigation was closed for lack of evidence, allowing the Bronze Star presentation ceremony to proceed for the entire team.

In April 2005, Perry left the Canadian military.

Records
Preceded by Carlos Hathcock	Longest recorded sniper kill 2002; 2,310 m (2,526 yd / 1.435 mi) long-range sniper weapon (LRSW) w/ Hornady A-MAX .50	Succeeded by Rob Furlong
