= Accuracy International AWM =

Sniper rifle

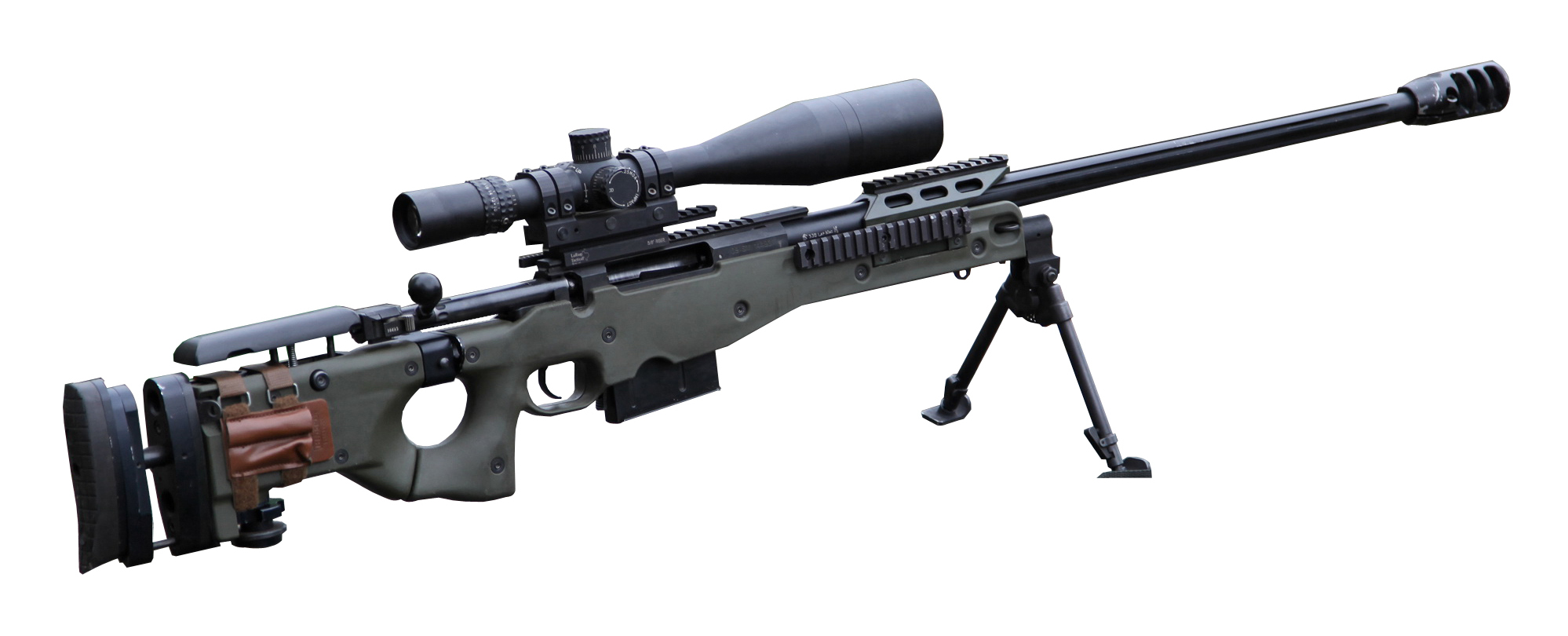
- Accuracy International AWM sniper rifle with several mounting interface kits
- Type: Bolt action sniper rifle
- Place of origin: United Kingdom

Service history
- In service: 1996–present
- Used by: See Users
- Wars: War in Afghanistan; Iraq War; Operation Inherent Resolve; Russian invasion of Ukraine

Production history
- Manufacturer: Accuracy International
- Produced: 1996–2013
- Variants: AWM-F, L115A2, and L115A3 (British Army)

Specifications
- Mass: 6.9 kg (15 lb 3 oz)
- Length: 1,270 mm (4 ft 2 in)
- Barrel length: 686 mm (27.0 in)
- Cartridge: .300 Winchester Magnum.338 Lapua Magnum
- Muzzle velocity: 936 m/s (3,070 ft/s)
- Effective firing range: 1,100 m (1,200 yd) (.300 Winchester Magnum); 1,500 m (1,600 yd) (.338 Lapua Magnum)
- Feed system: 5-round detachable box magazine
- Sights: Detachable aperture type iron sights Day or night optics

The Accuracy International AWM (Arctic Warfare Magnum or AI-Arctic Warfare Magnum) is a bolt-action sniper rifle manufactured by British firearms company Accuracy International designed for magnum rifle cartridges. The Accuracy International AWM is also unofficially known as the AWSM (Arctic Warfare Super Magnum), which typically denotes AWM rifles chambered in .338 Lapua Magnum.

On 9 September 2012, Accuracy International announced that the .338 Lapua Magnum AWM rifle was phased out and replaced by the Accuracy International AXMC sniper rifle. The bolt action of the AXMC was designed to be significantly stronger and more capable of handling higher chamber pressures and temperatures and thus higher bolt thrust safely compared to the AWM and hence is longer and wider. The AXMC magazine was also appropriately enlarged to function with .338 Lapua Magnum cartridges loaded to the Commission Internationale Permanente pour l'Epreuve des Armes à Feu Portatives (C.I.P.) maximum allowed overall length of 93.50 mm (3.681 in).

== Arctic Warfare Magnum System ==
The Accuracy International AWM sniper rifle is a variant of the British Accuracy International Arctic Warfare (AW) rifle that was the basis of a family of sniper rifles using the Arctic Warfare name. As such the design details of the AWM variant are similar to the ones found in the basic AW rifle system. Compared to the AW, the AWM has a longer bolt to accommodate larger magnum-length cartridges such as the .300 Winchester Magnum and the .338 Lapua Magnum. The bolt head, locking ring, and extractor and magazines were also revised to work with the increased size and operating pressures of magnum rifle cartridges.

The AWM features a detachable single stack removable box magazine which holds five rounds. The normal cartridges for this rifle, and the ones which have been accepted by NATO for use in AWM rifles, are .300 Winchester Magnum and .338 Lapua Magnum.

Muzzle brakes are fitted to reduce recoil, jump and flash and act as a base for optional iron sights and suppressors.

Standard configurations include a Schmidt & Bender PM II 5-25×56FFP MK II telescopic sight with P4F graticule but variants with variable magnification of either 3–12×50 or 4–16×50 are also available. Accuracy International actively promotes fitting the German made Schmidt & Bender PM II/MILITARY MK II product line as sighting components on their rifles, which is rare for a rifle manufacturer. The German and Russian Army prefer a telescopic sight made by Zeiss.

The AWM rifle is normally supplied in a metal transit case together with a telescopic sight, mount, butt spacers, bipod, spare magazines, sling, cleaning and tool kits.

== Magnum chamberings ==
=== .300 Winchester Magnum ===
The .300 Winchester Magnum (7.62×67mm) cartridge was designed as a magnum hunting cartridge and offers a flatter trajectory and a significant increase in muzzle velocity, wind resistance and supersonic range over the smaller 7.62×51mm NATO cartridge. The ability of the .300 Winchester Magnum chambering to obtain fairly high muzzle velocities, combined with relatively heavy and long very-low-drag bullets, significantly enhance the hit probability at longer ranges and hence the effective range compared to the 7.62×51mm NATO cartridge. The AWM chambered for the .300 is fitted with a fluted, stainless steel barrel that is 660 mm (26 in) long and features a non-traditional 279.4 mm (1:11 in) right-hand twist rate.

=== .338 Lapua Magnum ===
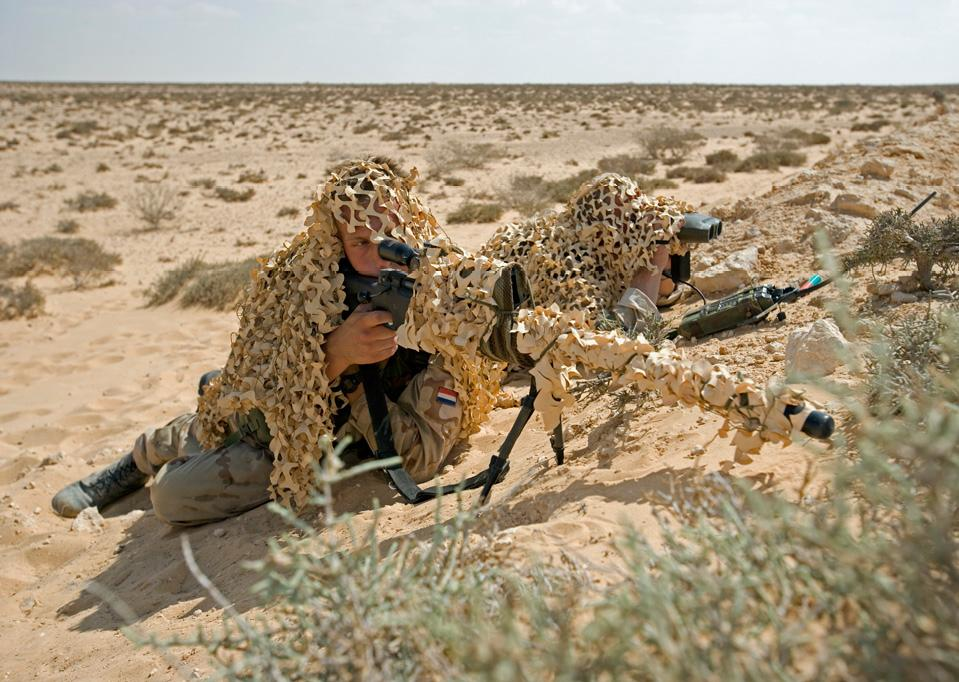
A Dutch ISAF sniper team with an Accuracy International AWM .338 Lapua Magnum rifle.

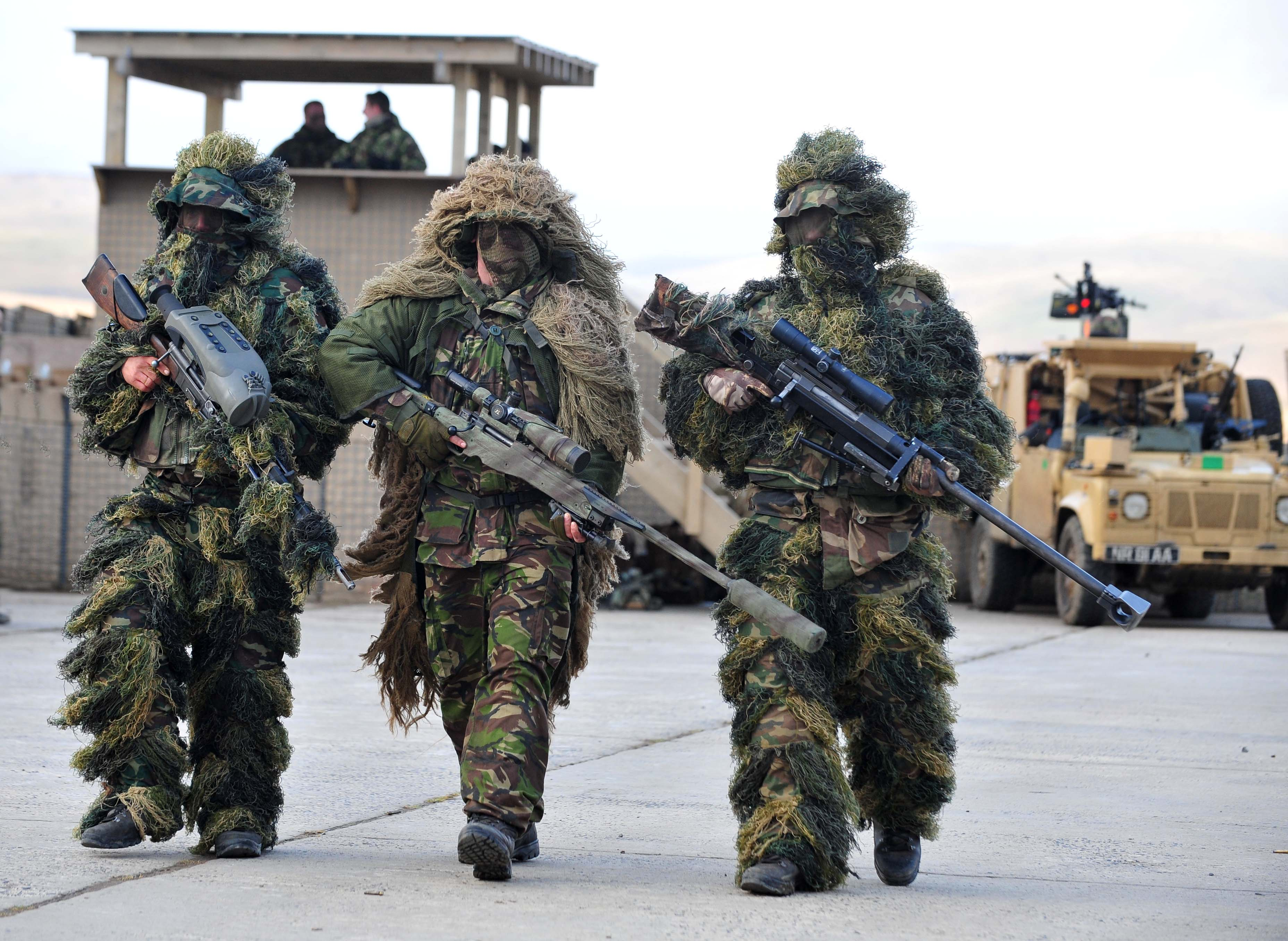
A British sniper (centre) carrying his L115A3 Long Range Rifle with attached suppressor, on a joint training mission with French snipers.

The AWM in the .338 Lapua Magnum (8.6×70mm) calibre was designed as a dedicated long range sniper rifle. The rifle is fitted with a stainless steel, fluted, 686 mm (27.0 in) barrel, which research has found to be the best compromise between muzzle velocity, weight, and length. The barrel has an unconventional 279 mm (1:11 in) right-hand twist rate, optimized for firing .338-calibre very-low-drag bullets up to 16.85 g (260 gr). When the AWM .338 Lapua Magnum was developed military issue cartridges were loaded with 16.2 g (250 gr) very-low-drag bullets. Longer, heavier very-low-drag bullets like the Sierra HPBT MatchKing .338-calibre 19.44 g (300 gr) and the 21st century 19.44 gram (300 grain) .338-calibre HPBT Scenar can be used, but require a 254 mm (1:10 in) twist rate to stabilize them under high air density conditions as found on arctic coasts.

A limitation of AWM rifles is that .338 Lapua Magnum cartridges loaded to the Commission Internationale Permanente pour l'Epreuve des Armes à Feu Portatives (C.I.P.) maximum allowed overall length of 93.50 mm (3.681 in) do not fit in the magazine due to a lack of internal magazine length. This is because the AWM bolt action was initially developed for smaller cartridges, and then modified for the .338 Lapua Magnum chambering. Ammunition manufacturers produce .338 Lapua Magnum military issue cartridges loaded with 16.2 g (250 gr) very-low-drag bullets (overall length ≤ 91.44 mm (3.600 in)) that fit in the 91.5 mm (3.60 in) long AWM magazines. As long as .338 Lapua Magnum cartridges that fit in the magazines are used, the AWM rifles can be used as repeating rifles instead of single shot rifles.

To address .338 Lapua Magnum ammunition length limitations of the AWM, Accuracy International has since developed the AX338 long range rifle as the AWM successor model. The bolt action of the AX338 is longer and wider than the AWM, and the internal magazine is lengthened, allowing the unimpaired use of .338 Lapua Magnum cartridges loaded to the C.I.P. (Permanent International Commission for the Proof of Firearms Portable) maximum allowed overall length of 93.5 mm (3.68 in). Furthermore, the AX338 has a 238 mm (1:9.375 in) twist rate to adequately stabilize longer, heavier .338 caliber very-low-drag projectile designs that became more common in the 21st century.

Ammunition types available for the .338 Lapua Magnum are FMJ, hollow point, armour piercing (AP) and armour piercing incendiary (API).

=== Extreme range confirmed sniper kill ===
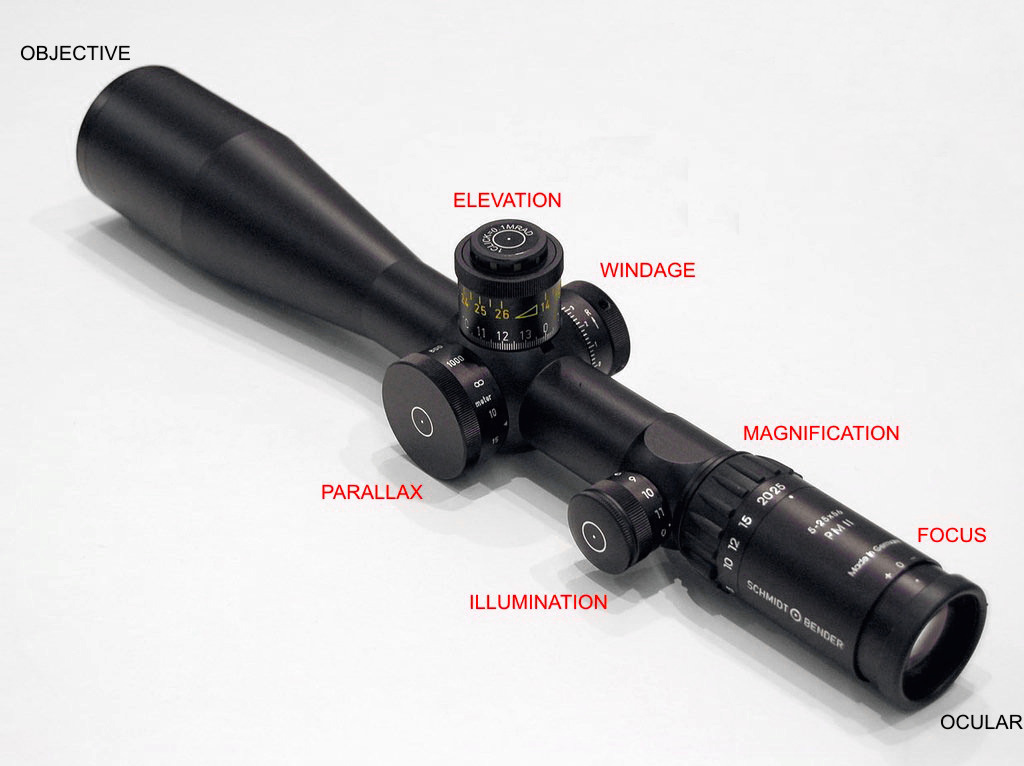
Schmidt & Bender 5-25×56 PM II LP telescopic sight, similar to the sight used by Harrison, and its adjustment controls

In November 2009, British Army sniper Corporal of Horse (CoH) Craig Harrison, a member of the Household Cavalry, set the record for longest recorded sniper kill, at the time, by killing two Taliban machine gunners consecutively south of Musa Qala in Helmand Province in Afghanistan at a range of 2,475 m (2,707 yd) taking 10 shots to hit the target, using a L115A3 Long Range Rifle.

== Military adoption ==
=== British Armed Forces ===
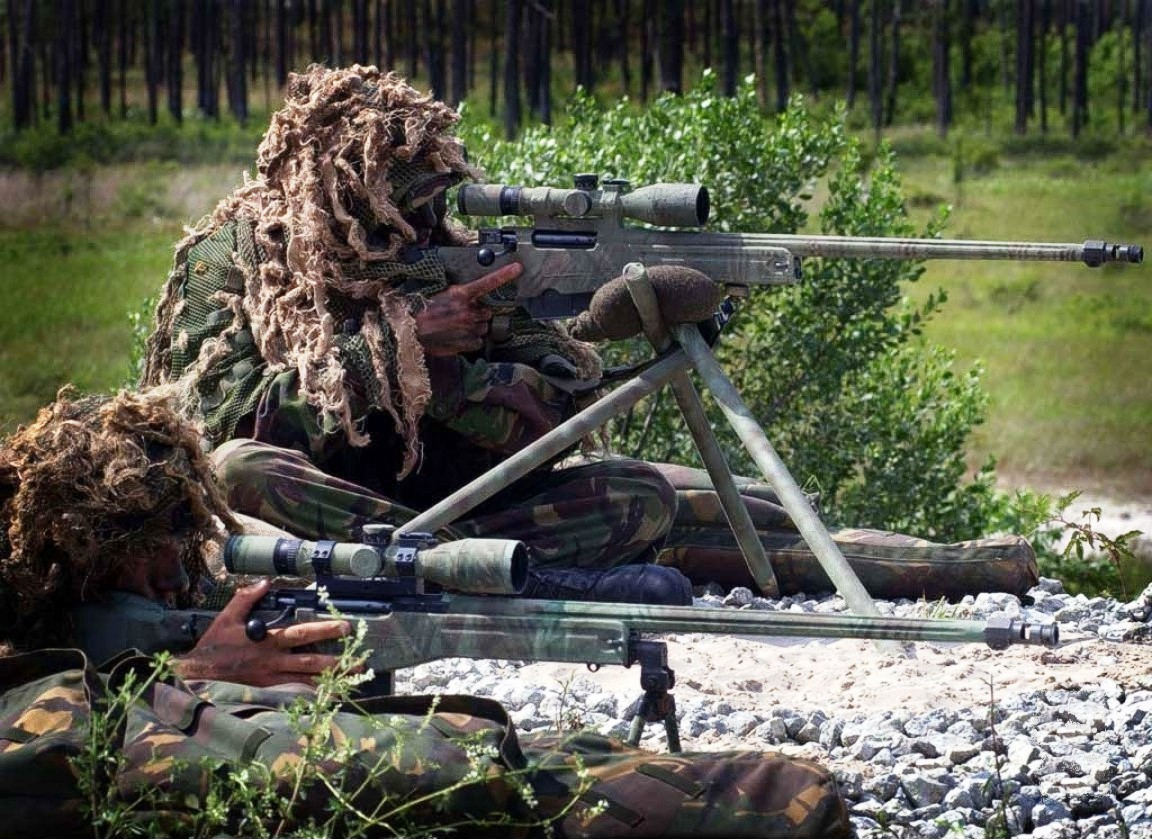
Royal Marines with L115A1 rifles

The British Armed Forces adopted the AWM rifle chambered in .338 Lapua Magnum as the L115A1 Long Range Rifle. The British L115A1 rifles are fitted with Schmidt & Bender 3-12×50 mm PM II/MILITARY MK II 3-12×50 mm 0.1 mil telescopic sights. The L115A1 was in service with the Royal Marines, British Army and RAF Regiment in Afghanistan and Iraq.

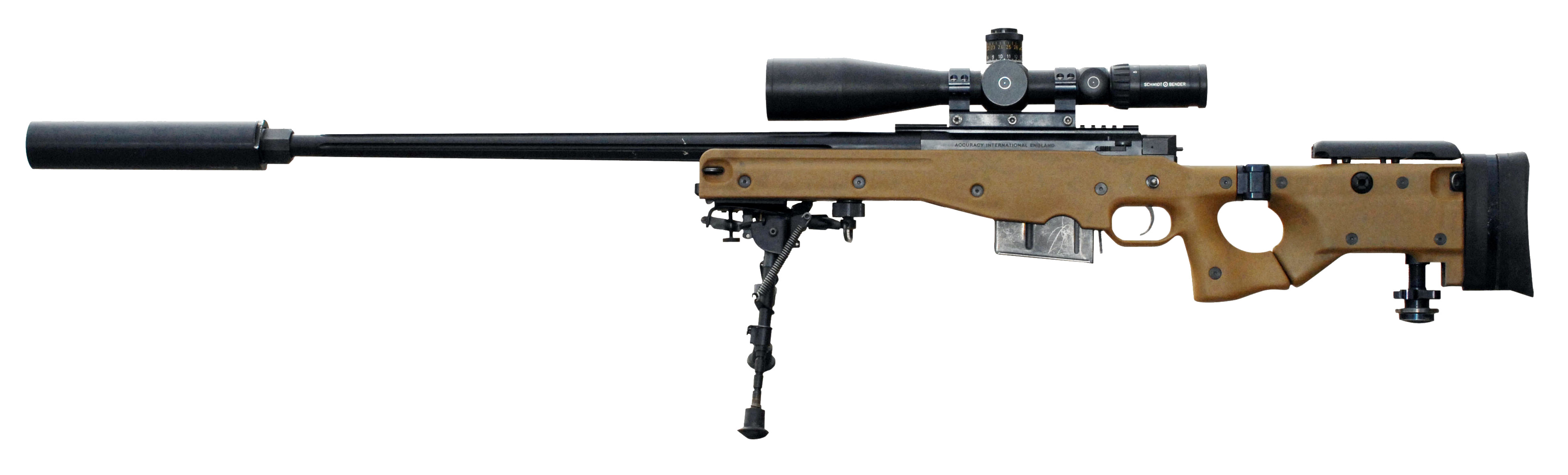
The L115A3 Long Range Rifle

In November 2007 the British Ministry of Defence (MOD) announced that their snipers in the Army, Royal Marines and RAF Regiment were to get a new rifle. Accuracy International would supply 580 L115A3 Long Range Rifles with daytime telescopic sights. The L115A3 is being supplied as part of a broader Sniper System Improvement Programme (SSIP) which also includes night sights, spotting scopes, laser rangefinders and tripods. The L115A3 rifle was first deployed to Afghanistan in May 2008.

Features of the improved L115A3 include:

- Schmidt & Bender 5-25×56 mm PM II LP/MILITARY MK II 5-25×56 0.1 mil parallax, illumination, double turn telescopic sights
- Suppressors to reduce the flash and noise signature
- Folding stocks for better carrying in a backpack
- Adjustable cheek pieces for more comfort and better eye alignment with the telescopic sight
- Butt spikes (monopods) to aid stability during firing
- Adjustable bipods, which differ from the original Accuracy International bipod
- 5-round box magazines

The MOD claims a muzzle velocity of 936 m/s (3,071 ft/s) for the L115A3 (another folding stock variant next to the AWM-F).

When the L115A3 Long Range Rifle was only six years into its life cycle the British Ministry of Defence (MOD) recognized the improved capabilities of the AX series rifles for special forces use. The AX series new chassis system provided more flexibility to utilize (future) low light and daylight aiming optics, laser designators, and other accessories without the need for custom-made mounting interface kits. The right folding AX series chassis system was also more compact in the folded configuration making it more portable and concealable, and featured a pistol grip. On the request of the MOD, Accuracy International explored the possibility of updating the L115A3 Long Range Rifle to the AX series chassis system, to produce a rifle that is a hybrid of AWM and AX features. The AX enhancements were well received by the MOD and British snipers, and an update programme was launched, producing the L115A4. The L115A4 can easily be mistaken for a new AX series rifle. The Schmidt & Bender 5-25×56 mm PM II LP/MILITARY MKII 5-25×56, as well as the suppressor, bipod and several other accessories from the L115A3, were reused in the L115A4, resulting in significant cost savings. Along with the rifle updates, the L115A4 includes a new deployment case, maintenance kit, and other accessories.

=== Dutch Armed Forces ===
The AWM-F commonly referred to as Geweer Lange Afstand (GLA) (Long Range Rifle) chambered in .338 Lapua Magnum was introduced from 1996 by the Dutch Army's Korps Commandotroepen snipers and the AWM is used by all Schutter Lange Afstand (SLA) (Long Range Marksmen) of the 11 Luchtmobiele Brigade (airborne infantry), 13th Light Brigade (motorised infantry), 43rd Mechanized Brigade (mechanized infantry). In 2007, the snipers of the Netherlands Marine Corps also received this sniper rifle. The Dutch AWM-F rifles are fitted with Schmidt & Bender 10×42 PM II and 3-12×50 PM II telescopic sights. The rifles are designated as Accuracy, antipersoneel scherpschuttersgeweer.338 (Accuracy anti personnel sniper rifle .338). The Military of the Netherlands claim a maximum effective range of 1,100 m (1,203 yd) for their AWM-F rifles and have used these rifles in Afghanistan with great success.

=== German Armed Forces ===
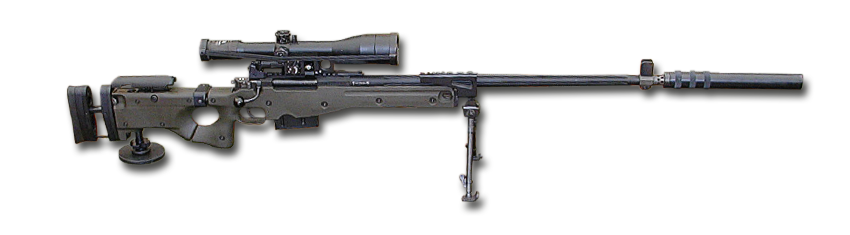
AWM-F or G22 in Bundeswehr nomenclature with attached suppressor

Since 1998 the Bundeswehr fields an AWM-F chambered in .300 Winchester Magnum (7.62 × 67 mm in Bundeswehr nomenclature), with a 3–12×56 SSG telescopic sight made by the German company Zeiss, under the designation of G22 (for Gewehr 22) or Scharfschützengewehr 22 (sniper rifle 22). The German G22 rifles have folding stocks and emergency iron sights. For their G22 rifles, the Bundeswehr claims an effective range of 1,100 m (1,203 yd) and muzzle velocity of 885 m/s (2,904 ft/s).

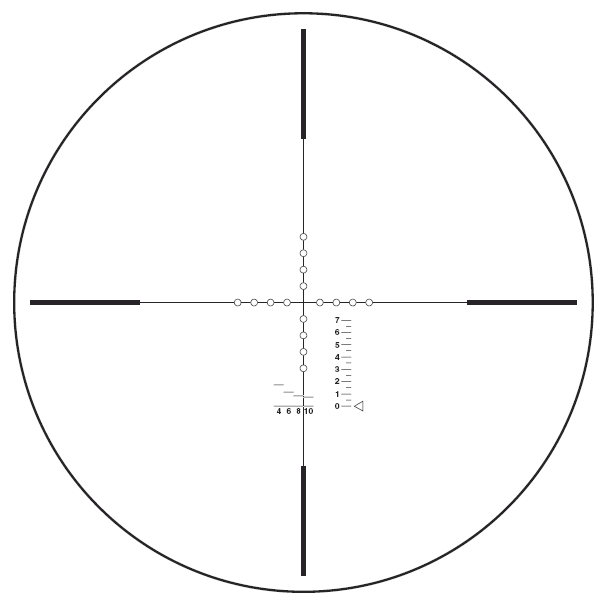
Zeiss 3–12×56 SSG reticle

The German ammunition manufacturer Metallwerk Elisenhütte Nassau (MEN) has specially developed 7.62 × 67 mm ammunition for the G22.

The Carl Zeiss Optronics (previously branded as Hensoldt) telescopic sight has a mil-dot reticle and a scale that enables the operator to see the dialled in elevation setting through the rifle scope's ocular. The Bundeswehr 3–12×56 SSG telescopic sight differs somewhat from the further developed 3–12×56 SSG-P telescopic sight. The Bundeswehr telescopic sight has no parallax setting option and the range scale has a setting range from 0 to 10 instead of 0 to 11 symbolizing the 11.2 milliradian elevation adjustment range shown in the current Carl Zeiss Optronics 3–12×56 SSG-P telescopic sight brochure.

The G22A1 has a Schmidt & Bender 3-12×50 telescopic sight and Harris Engineering bipod and is in use with German special forces.

The G22A2 is an upgraded variant featuring an AX series chassis stock, a new monopod and bipod, a new double chamber muzzle brake and a Steiner-Optik GmbH M5Xi 5-25×56 MTC LT LPF – TreMoR3s telescopic sight. The accessory pack besides spare and maintenance parts includes a Kestrel 5700 Elite Weather Meter with an integrated ballistic calculator. In 2019 Accuracy International was awarded a contract to refurbish and upgrade all G22 and G22A1 rifles to the G22A2 standard.

=== Royal Malaysia Police ===
The Unit Tindakhas (UTK) of the Pasukan Gerakan Khas (PGK) snipers from the Royal Malaysia Police use the AWM chambered in .338 Lapua Magnum alongside the Accuracy International Arctic Warfare chambered in 7.62mm.

=== Norwegian Special Forces ===
The snipers of Marinejegerkommandoen and Forsvarets Spesialkommando are known to have used the AWM, chambered in either .300 Winchester Magnum or .338 Lapua Magnum.

=== Russian Alpha Group ===
The snipers of the Russian Alpha Group counter-terrorism unit are using the AWM-F chambered in .338 Lapua Magnum with Zeiss 3–12×56 SSG series telescopic sights.

=== South Korean Special Forces ===
The 707th Special Mission BN from the Republic of Korea Army and the Republic of Korea Naval Special Warfare Flotilla from the ROK Navy use AWM series sniper rifles chambered in .338 Lapua Magnum outfitted with Schmidt & Bender 3-12×50 PM II telescopic sights. It has had some telescopic sight attachment problems.

== Users ==
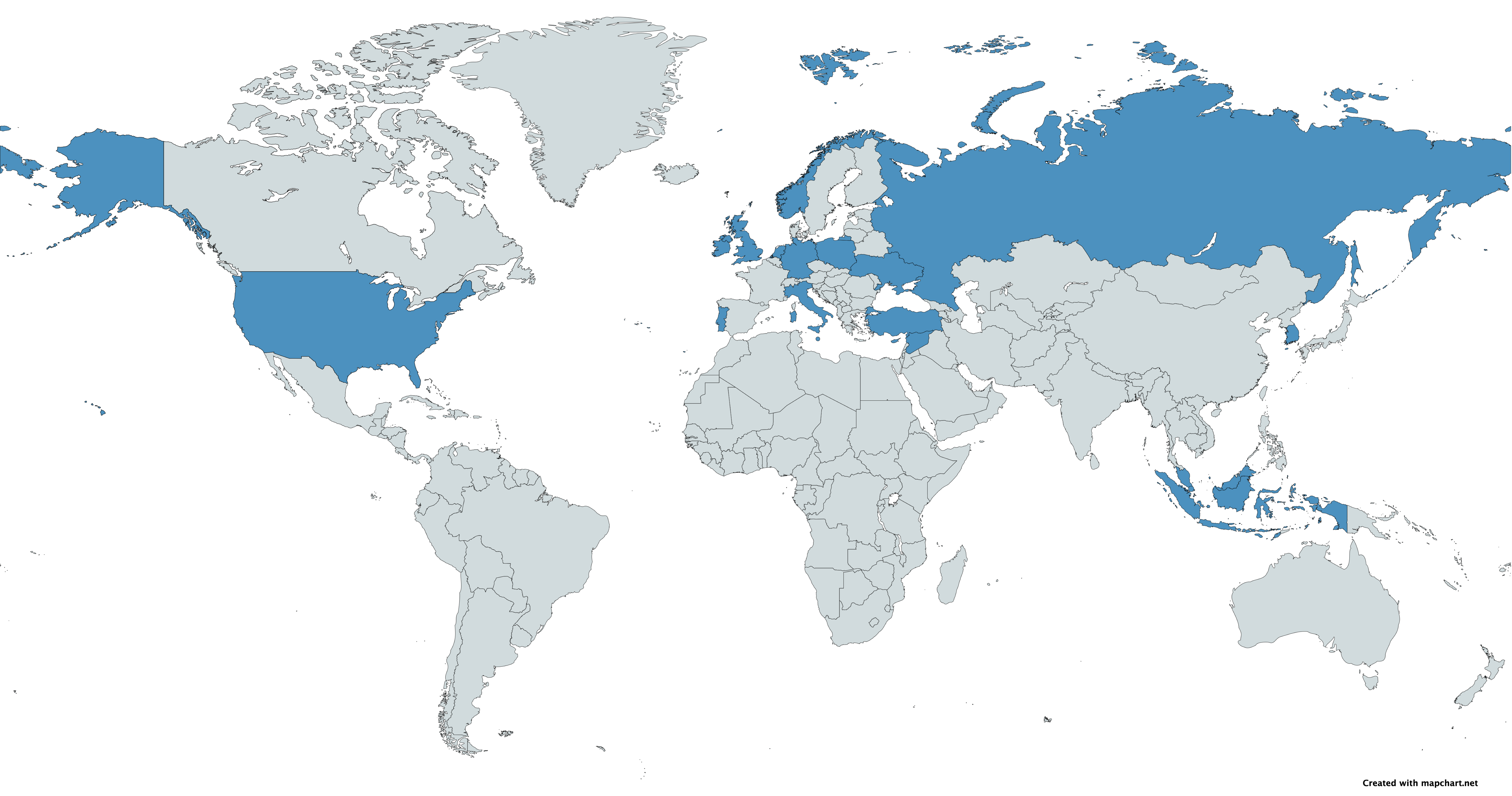
Map with AWM users in blue

- Cyprus: AWM – .338 Lapua Magnum version is used by the Special Forces of the National Guard.
- Germany: AWM-F (Bundeswehr designation G22) – .300 Winchester Magnum.
- Indonesia: AWM is used by the Komando Pasukan Katak (Kopaska) tactical diver group and Komando Pasukan Khusus (Kopassus) special forces group.
- Ireland: AWM - .338 Lapua Magnum version is used by the Army Ranger Wing.
- Italy: AWM – .338 Lapua Magnum version is used by the 9th Parachute Assault Regiment "Col Moschin".
- Malaysia: AWSM - .338 Lapua Magnum version is used by the Royal Malaysia Police with the PGK special operations police force.
- Malta: AWSM - .338 Lapua Magnum or .300 Winchester Magnum variants in use by Special Forces Snipers of the Force Elements at Readiness (FEAR) QRF Unit
- Netherlands: AWM, AWM-F and AXMC – .338 Lapua Magnum
- Norway: AWM – .300 Winchester Magnum or .338 Lapua Magnum versions.
- Poland: AWM-F – .338 Lapua Magnum version; GROM; 1 Pułk Specjalny Komandosów
- Portugal: AWM - .338 Lapua Magnum version is used by the Portuguese Army.
- Russia: AWM-F – .338 Lapua Magnum is used by the Alpha Group counter-terrorism unit.
- Singapore: AWM – .300 Winchester Magnum or .338 Lapua Magnum versions.
- South Korea: Is used by the 707th Special Mission Group.
- Syria: AWM - .338 Lapua Magnum version, used by special forces.
- Turkey: AWM – .338 Lapua Magnum version (Turkish Armed Forces Semdinli Sniper Team)
- Ukraine: AWM – .338 Lapua Magnum version, donated by the Netherlands in response to the 2022 Russian invasion of Ukraine.
- United Kingdom: AWM – .338 Lapua Magnum version.
- United States: AWM - .338 Lapua Magnum version

Records
Preceded by McMillan TAC-50	Longest confirmed combat sniper-shot kill 2009-2017; 2,475 m (2,707 yd / 1.538 mi) using 16.2 g (250 gr) Lapua LockBase B408 bullets by Craig Harrison	Succeeded by McMillan TAC-50
