= Scpl =

SCPL may refer to:

- Motorola SCPL, a prototype mobile phone
- Staff Corporal (SCpl), a rank in the British Household Cavalry
