= McMillan TAC-50 =

McMillan Firearms TAC-50
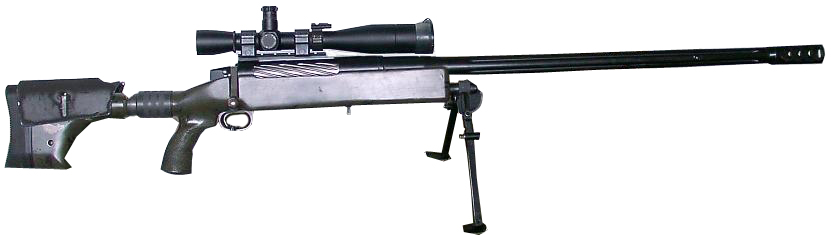
- A Canadian Army McMillan TAC-50 (C15) Long-Range Sniper Weapon (LRSW)
- Type: Anti-materiel rifle
- Place of origin: United States

Service history
- In service: 2000–present
- Used by: See Users
- Wars: War in Afghanistan; War in Iraq (2013–2017)

Production history
- Manufacturer: McMillan Firearms
- Produced: 2000–present
- Variants: TAC-50A1, TAC-50A1-R2, TAC-50C

Specifications
- Mass: 26.0 lb (11.8 kg)
- Length: 57.0 in (1,448 mm)
- Barrel length: 29.0 in (737 mm)
- Cartridge: .50 BMG
- Action: Bolt action
- Muzzle velocity: 823 m/s (2,700 ft/s) (750 gr A-MAX load)
- Effective firing range: 1,800 m (1,970 yd)
- Maximum firing range: Estimated 7,700 m (8,420 yd) (750 gr A-MAX load). Confirmed 3,540 m (3,870 yd)
- Feed system: 5 round detachable box magazine
- Sights: Customizable; 5-25x telescopic sight standard in Canadian Forces

The McMillan TAC-50 is a long-range anti-materiel rifle. The TAC-50 is based on previous designs from McMillan, which first appeared during the late 1980s. From March 2002 to November 2009 and May 2017 to November 2023, it held the record for the longest confirmed sniper kill. McMillan produces several .50 caliber rifles, based on the same proprietary action, for military, law enforcement and civilian use. It is produced in Phoenix, Arizona, in the United States by McMillan Firearms.

The TAC-50 is a military and law enforcement weapon, which, designated as the C15, has been the standard long-range sniper weapon (LRSW) of the Canadian Army since 2000. Rifles of the TAC-50 family are guaranteed to provide 0.5 minute of angle (MOA) groups with match-grade ammunition under ideal conditions.

== Design details ==
The McMillan TAC-50 is a manually operated, rotary bolt-action rifle. The large bolt has dual front locking lugs, and its body has spiral flutes to reduce weight. The heavy match-grade barrel, made by Lilja barrels, is also fluted to dissipate heat quickly and reduce overall weight, and fitted with an effective muzzle brake to reduce recoil. The rifle is fed from detachable box magazines, holding 5 rounds each. The stock is made from fiberglass, and is designed to be used from a bipod only. The buttstock is adjustable for length of pull with rubber spacers, and can be removed for compact storage. The rifle has no open sights; it can be used with a variety of telescopic or night sights.

In Canadian service, the standard telescopic sight was the McMillan endorsed Leupold Mark 4 16x40mm LR/T M1 Riflescope optical sight that has since been replaced by the Schmidt & Bender 5-25×56 PMII telescopic sight. McMillan also endorses the Nightforce NXS 8-32x56 Mil-dot telescopic sight for the TAC-50.

== Variants ==
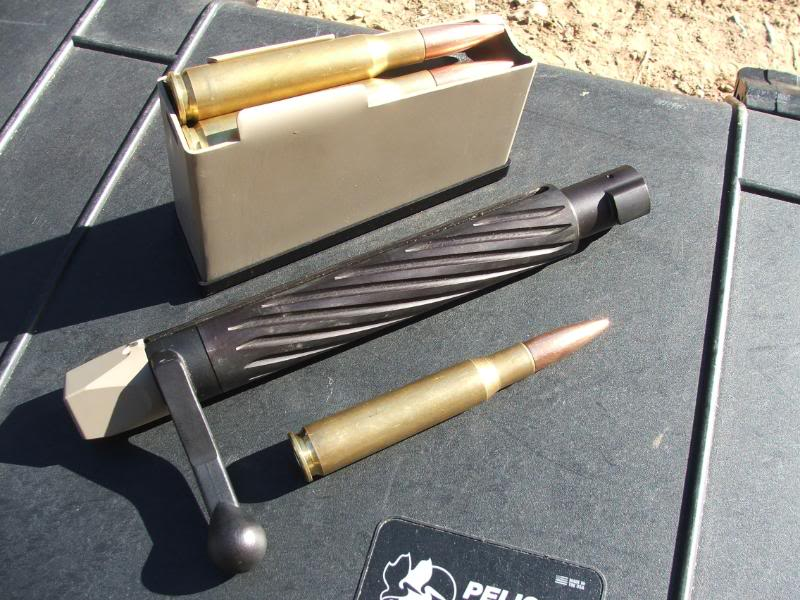
McMillan TAC-50 .50 BMG cartridge

=== TAC-50A1 ===
The TAC-50A1 variant was introduced in 2012. The TAC-50 A1 has a new take-down fiberglass stock with a forend that is 5 in (127 mm) longer than the TAC-50 stock. This moves the balance point for the bipod forward. The stock includes an integral cheekpiece and a monopod on the buttstock with an option for vertical adjustment. The stock incorporates a smaller pistol grip to fit a wider range of hand shapes, with and without gloves. The magazine release lever was repositioned ahead of the trigger bow to make the system easier to operate with gloved hands. For the A1 variant a new lighter bipod with legs that adjust vertically, as well as forward and rearward, to fine-tune the rifle for elevation was also developed.

=== TAC-50A1-R2 ===
The TAC-50A1-R2 variant was introduced in 2012 alongside the TAC-50A1 variant. The A1-R2 variant is effectively a TAC-50A1 rifle system with a hydraulic recoil mitigation system (a proprietary hydraulic piston in the buttstock) added to reduce the considerable amount of free recoil generated by the .50 BMG chambering, and hence increase user comfort.

=== TAC-50C ===
The TAC-50C is an update to the TAC-50A1. The TAC-50C features the new folding Cadex Dual Strike chassis system. It includes an adjustable cheekpiece with vertical adjustment and an adjustable length of pull. The stock incorporates a smaller pistol grip to fit a wider range of hand shapes, with and without gloves. Three Picatinny rail sections allow for customization of accessories.

== World record ==
An unnamed Canadian Joint Task Force 2 sniper made the longest recorded sniper kill with this weapon in Iraq, hitting an ISIS fighter at a range of 3,540 meters (3,870 yd; 2.20 miles) in the 30-day period leading up to 22 June 2017.

The previous record of 2,475 meters (2,707 yd; 1.538 miles) was set by British sniper Craig Harrison in 2009 in Afghanistan, using a .338 Lapua Magnum chambered L115A3 Long Range Rifle sniper rifle.

Three of the top ten longest recorded sniper kills were made by Canadian soldiers with the McMillan TAC-50 rifle.

== Users ==
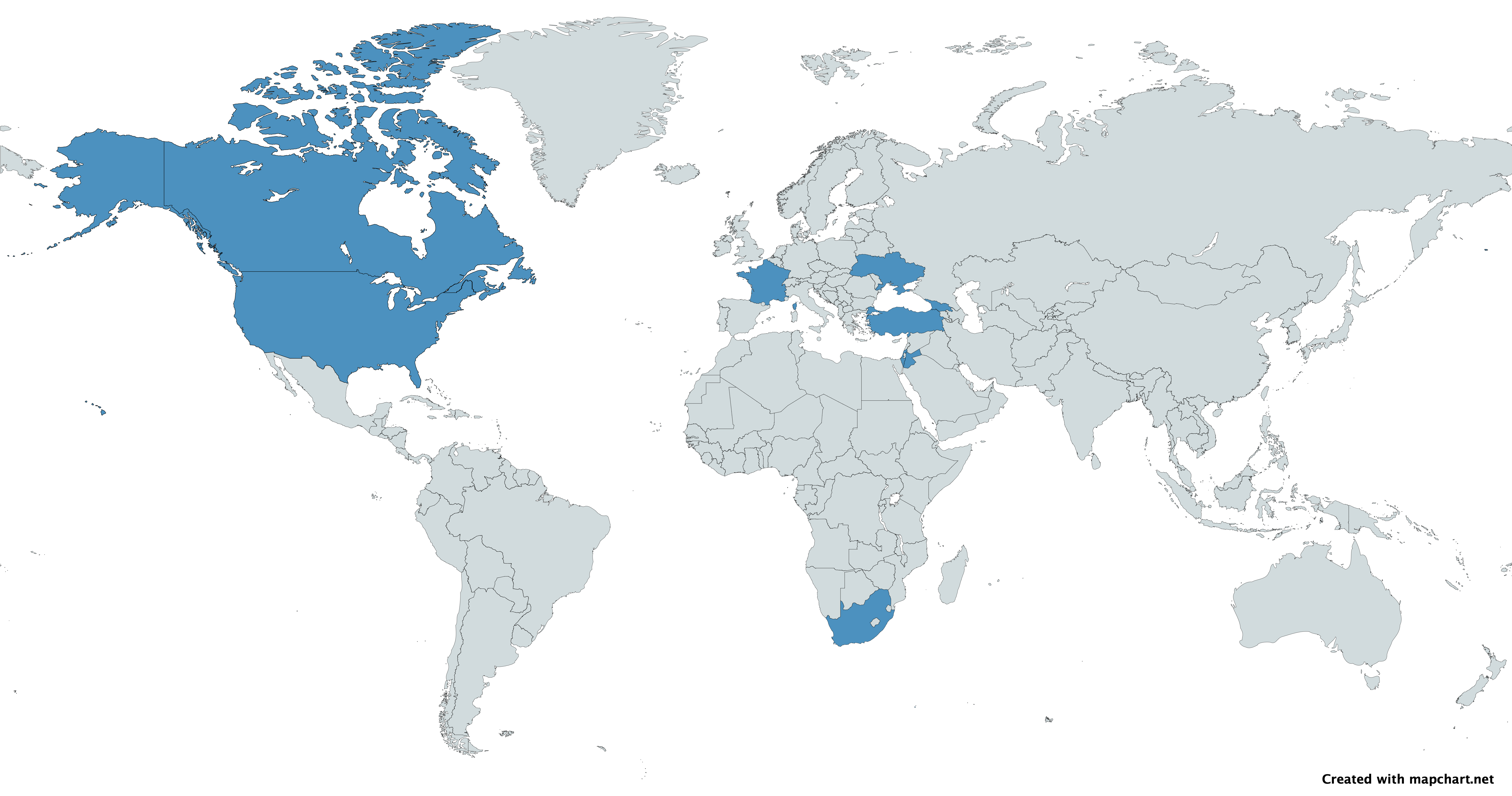
Map with Tac-50 users in blue

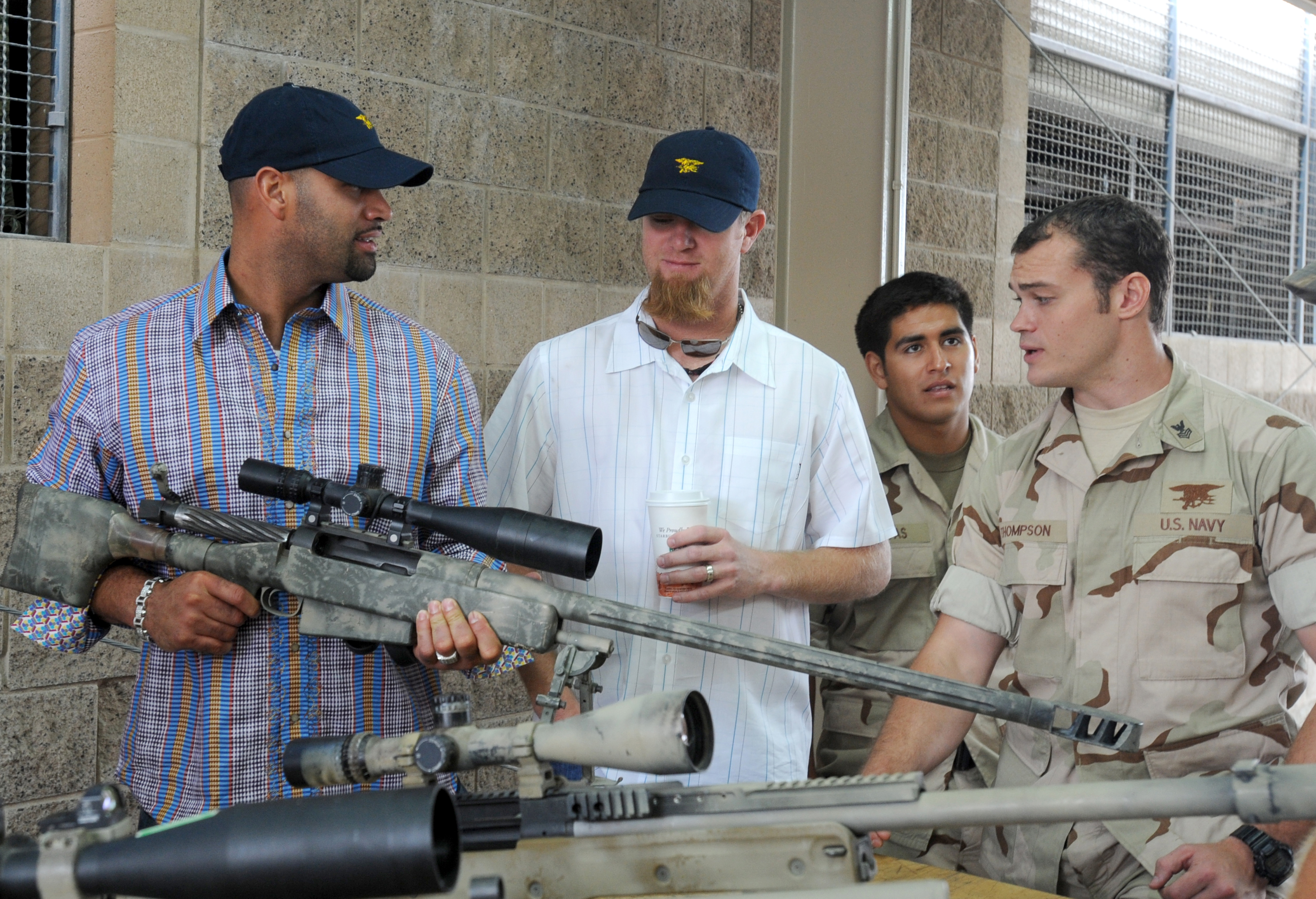
Special Warfare Operator 1st Class Thompson explains details of an Mk 15 sniper rifle to major league baseball players Albert Pujols and Ryan Franklin during a tour of Naval Special Warfare facilities.

- Canada: Canadian Army, JTF2 Original TAC-50 designated as the C15 Long-Range Sniper Weapon (LRSW) when it entered service in 2000. The C15 was then updated to the TAC-50A1 variant in 2014, and designated the C15A1 Long-Range Sniper Weapon (LRSW). The rifles were then upgraded again to the TAC-50C variant beginning in 2017, and designated C15A2 Long-Range Sniper Weapon (LRSW).
- France: Infantry of the FORPRONU and French Navy commandos.
- Georgia: Army & special operations forces.
- Israel: Used by special forces units.
- Jordan: Used by SRR-61 (Special Reconnaissance Regiment).
- South Africa: In service with South African Police Service Special Task Force.
- Turkey: Turkish Gendarmerie and Special Forces Command
- Ukraine: Ukrainian Army
- United States: United States Navy SEALs designated as the Mk 15.

== See also ==
- List of sniper rifles

Records
Preceded by Accuracy International L115A3	Longest confirmed combat sniper-shot kill 2017-2023; 3,540 m (3,871 yd); Long-Range Sniper Weapon (LRSW) w/ Hornady A-MAX .50 by Canadian JTF 2 sniper (name withheld)	Succeeded by Horizon's Lord
