= Graham Ragsdale =

Canadian sniper

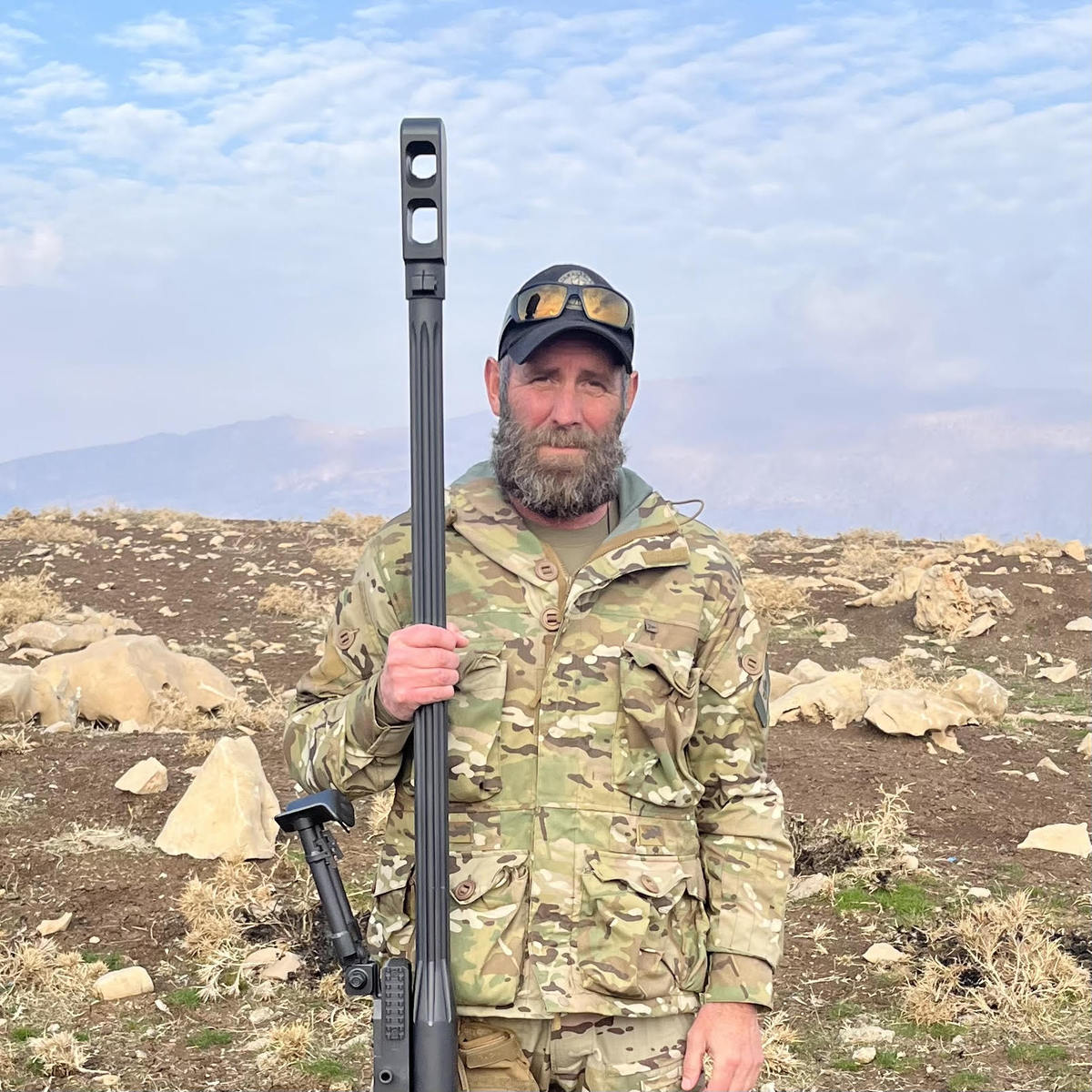
- Born: 28 June 1969 (age 57); Owen Sound, Ontario, Canada
- Military career
- Allegiance: Canada
- Branch: Canadian Army
- Service years: 1988–2003
- Rank: Master Corporal
- Unit: 3rd Battalion Princess Patricia's Canadian Light Infantry
- Conflicts: NATO intervention in Bosnia and Herzegovina; War in Afghanistan
- Awards: Mentioned in Despatches; Bronze Star Medal (United States)

Graham Ragsdale (born 28 June 1969) is a former soldier of the Canadian Forces. He commanded the sniper team from the 3rd Battalion Princess Patricia's Canadian Light Infantry attached to the United States Army 187th Infantry Regiment, 101st Airborne Division during Operation Anaconda in the Shah-i-Kot Valley, Paktia Province, Afghanistan, in March 2002. He was awarded the United States Bronze Star Medal with "V" device for his actions in combat and was mentioned in dispatches by the Canadian Forces.

== Early life and military career ==
Graham Ragsdale was born on 28 June 1969 in Owen Sound, Ontario, Canada.

He joined the Canadian Forces in 1988 after graduating from secondary school. Ragsdale began his military career with the 2nd Commando of the Canadian Airborne Regiment before transitioning to the 3rd Battalion PPCLI.

In 1991, after his initial three-year service contract, he chose to be released from the regular force and joined a Canadian Rangers patrol group. At this time he was also pursuing an amateur boxing career with Olympic hopes. He rejoined the regular force in 1996 and was posted to the newly formed 3rd Battalion Princess Patricia's Canadian Light Infantry.

=== Afghanistan and Operation Anaconda ===
Ragsdale was assigned to Canada's involvement in the Afghanistan War, particularly during Operation Anaconda in 2002. As part of the sniper detachment, Ragsdale and his team were embedded with U.S. forces in the Shah-i-Kot Valley, a region controlled by Taliban and al-Qaeda forces.

During this mission, within a few days in March 2002, Ragsdale's five-person unit set new records for the longest combat sniper kills in history. Master Corporal Arron Perry's shot of 2,310 metres (1.44 miles) broke the 34-year-old record set in the Vietnam War by a US Marine, Carlos Hathcock, in 1967; days later, Corporal Rob Furlong's shot of 2,430 metres (1.51 miles) broke Perry's record for longest combat sniper kill. Furlong's record would stand for seven and a half years.

=== Investigation and aftermath ===
Shortly after Operation Anaconda, allegations surfaced against one of the snipers, Arron Perry, regarding the desecration of an enemy corpse. This led to an investigation by the Canadian military's National Investigation Service (NIS). As the investigation unfolded, Ragsdale was relieved of his command of the sniper unit.

=== Post-military career ===
He worked many years as a designated defensive marksman in a counter-sniper role for various private military companies throughout Afghanistan and the Maghreb region of North Africa.

After serving in military, Ragsdale was, as of 2017, working for Rob Furlong's Marksmanship Academy as an instructor.

== Medals and decorations ==
- Sacrifice Medal (replacing the previously awarded Wound Stripe) – Afghanistan
- South-West Asia Service Medal
- Special Service Medal – Rangers and Alert
- Canadian Peacekeeping Service Medal
- NATO SFOR Medal – Former Yugoslavia
- Bronze Star Medal with "V" device (United States)
- Mentioned in Despatches
- Commander-in-Chief Unit Commendation
