= McMillan Firearms =

American firearms manufacturer

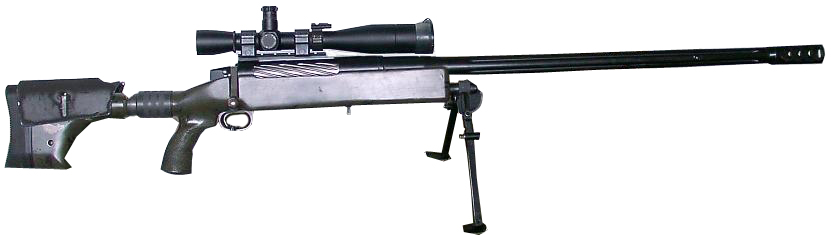
The McMillan Tac-50 is one of McMillan Firearms's best-known products.

McMillan Firearms is an American arms manufacturer that makes the McMillan Tac-50, its .50 BMG long-range anti-materiel and sniper rifle. It also produces the McMillan Tac-338, McMillan Tac-300 and McMillan Tac-308 sniper rifles, the ALIAS Rifle System and various hunting rifles.

== History ==
In 2007 Ryan McMillan co-founded McMillan Firearms Manufacturing before it was sold in late 2013 to Strategic Armory Corps, adding to its hunting and tactical division.

== Organization ==
McMillan Firearms is based in Phoenix, Arizona and it also has a distribution office in Johannesburg, South Africa.
