= List of books, articles and documentaries about snipers =

This is a list of books, articles, and documentaries about snipers.

== Books ==
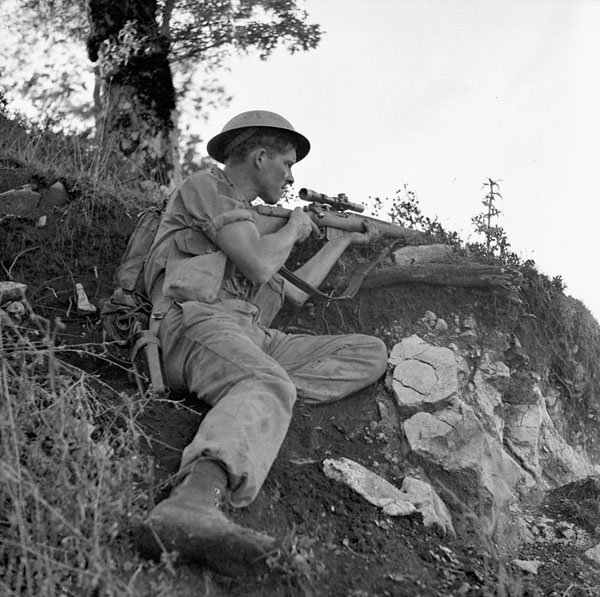
Canadian sniper

=== Non-fiction ===
- Kyle, Chris (2013). American Sniper: The Autobiography of the Most Lethal Sniper in U.S. Military History (2013 ed.). Turtleback Books. ISBN 9780606366564.
- Henderson, Charles (1986). Marine Sniper: 93 Confirmed Kills (1986 ed.). Stein and Day. ISBN 0812830555.
- Mitic, Jody (2015). Unflinching: The Making of a Canadian Sniper. Simon & Schuster. ISBN 9781476795102.
- Craig Harrison (2015) The Longest Kill: The Story of Maverick 41. ISBN 9780283072284.

=== Fiction ===
- McEwen, Scott (2013). Sniper Elite: One-Way Trip: A Novel. Touchstone. ISBN 9781476746050.

== Articles ==
- Langewiesche, William. "The Distant Executioner". Vanity Fair. February 2010.

== Documentaries ==
- History Channel. (2011). Sniper Inside the Crosshairs. Lionsgate Home Entertainment.

== See also ==
- List of snipers
