= Craig Harrison (British Army soldier) =

British sniper

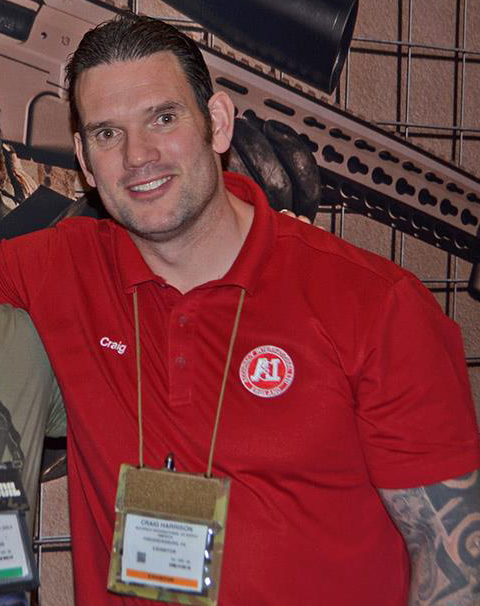
- Born: November 1974 (age 51); Cheltenham, Gloucestershire
- Military career
- Allegiance: United Kingdom
- Branch: British Army
- Service years: 1990–2014
- Rank: Corporal of Horse
- Units: Household Cavalry, Blues and Royals
- Conflicts: Afghanistan War; Iraq War; Bosnia; Kosovo

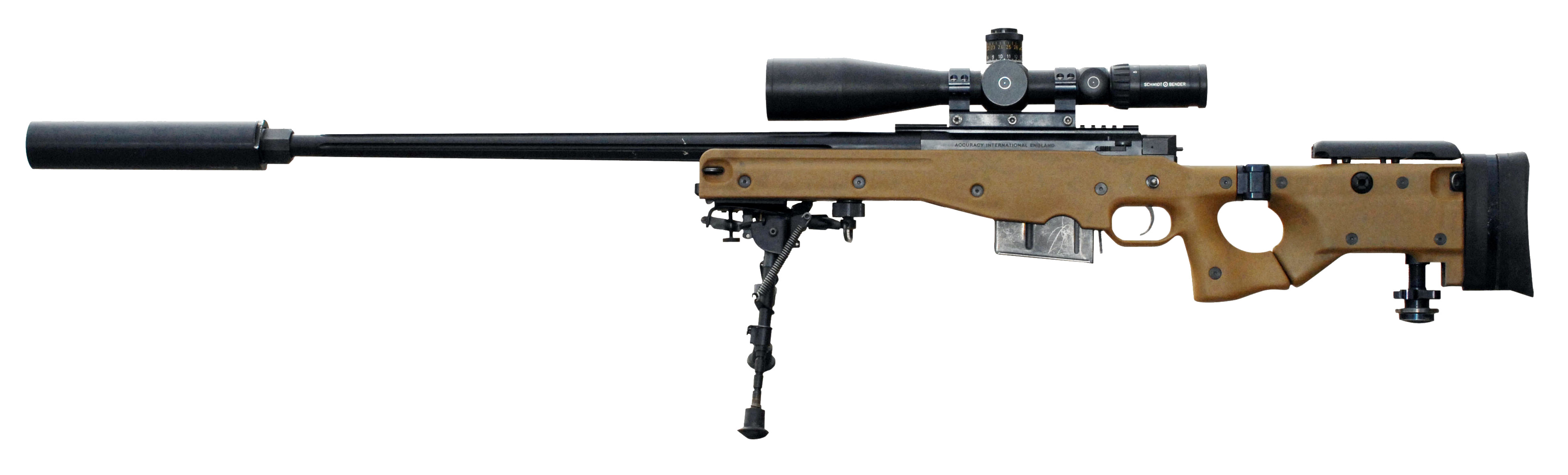
The L115A3 Long Range Rifle.

Craig Harrison (born November 1974) is a former Corporal of Horse (CoH) in the Blues and Royals, a cavalry regiment of the British Army, who from 2009 to 2012 held the record for the longest confirmed sniper kill in combat, at a range of 2,475 m (2,707 yd). Harrison is most famous for his military service in Afghanistan as a sniper, but he also served in the British Army in Iraq and the Balkans.

== Discovering sniping ==
The first time Harrison used a sniper rifle was when firing a Dragunov sniper rifle (SVD) on a firing range near a British military base in Split, Croatia. In his autobiography The Longest Kill, Harrison described the rifle as looking like "an elongated AK" and after firing at a tree he says it "practically split the tree in half".

== Record details ==
In November 2009, Harrison consecutively struck two Taliban machine gunners south of Musa Qala in Helmand Province in Afghanistan at a range of 2,475 m (2,707 yd) using a L115A3 Long Range Rifle. In a BBC interview, Harrison reported it took about nine shots for him and his spotter to range the target, using a bracketing technique. Then, he reported, his first shot "on target" was a killing shot followed consecutively by a kill shot on a second machine gunner. The bodies were later found by Afghan National Police looking to retrieve the weapon (which had already been removed). The first Taliban was shot in the gut and the other through the side. Later in the day an Apache helicopter hovered over the firing position, using its laser range finder to measure the distance to the machine-gun position, confirming the then record distance.

In the reports, Harrison mentions the environmental conditions were perfect for long range shooting: no wind, mild weather and clear visibility.

=== Ballistics and use of environment and equipment to achieve the aiming solution ===
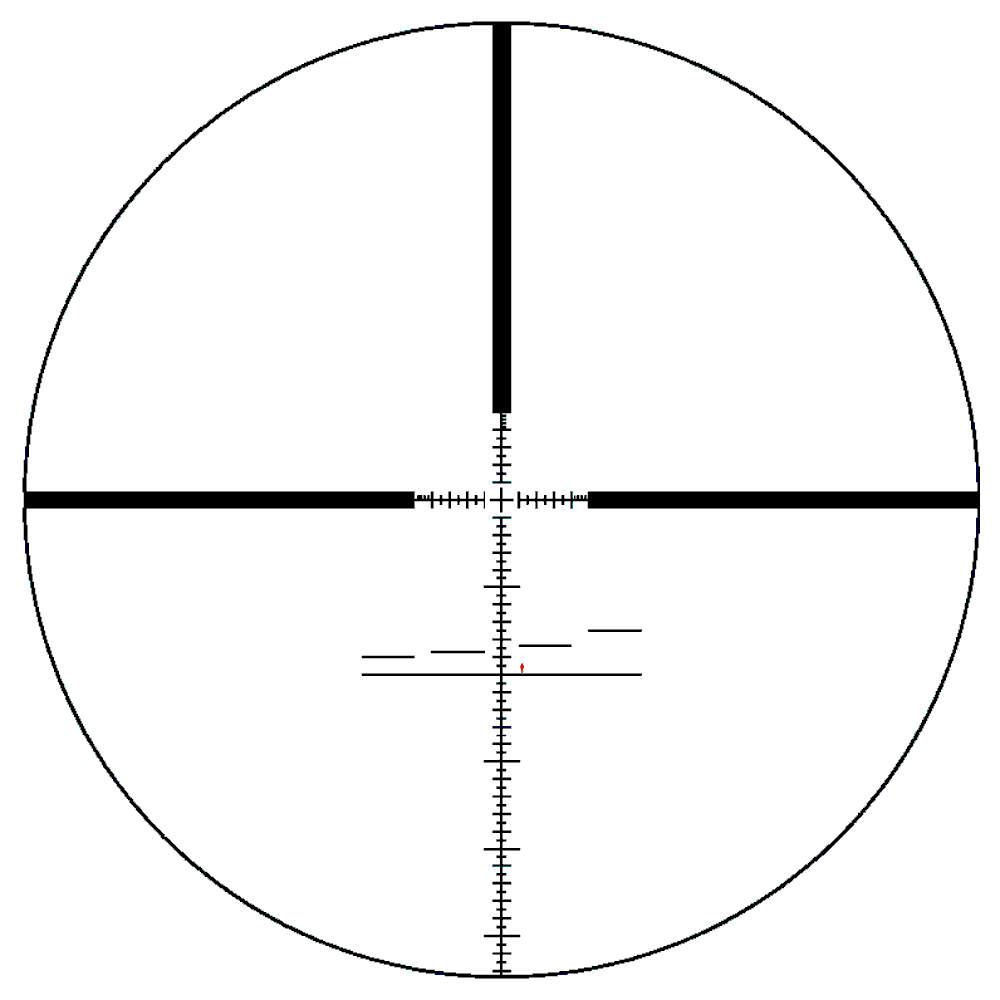
Seen at 5× zoom

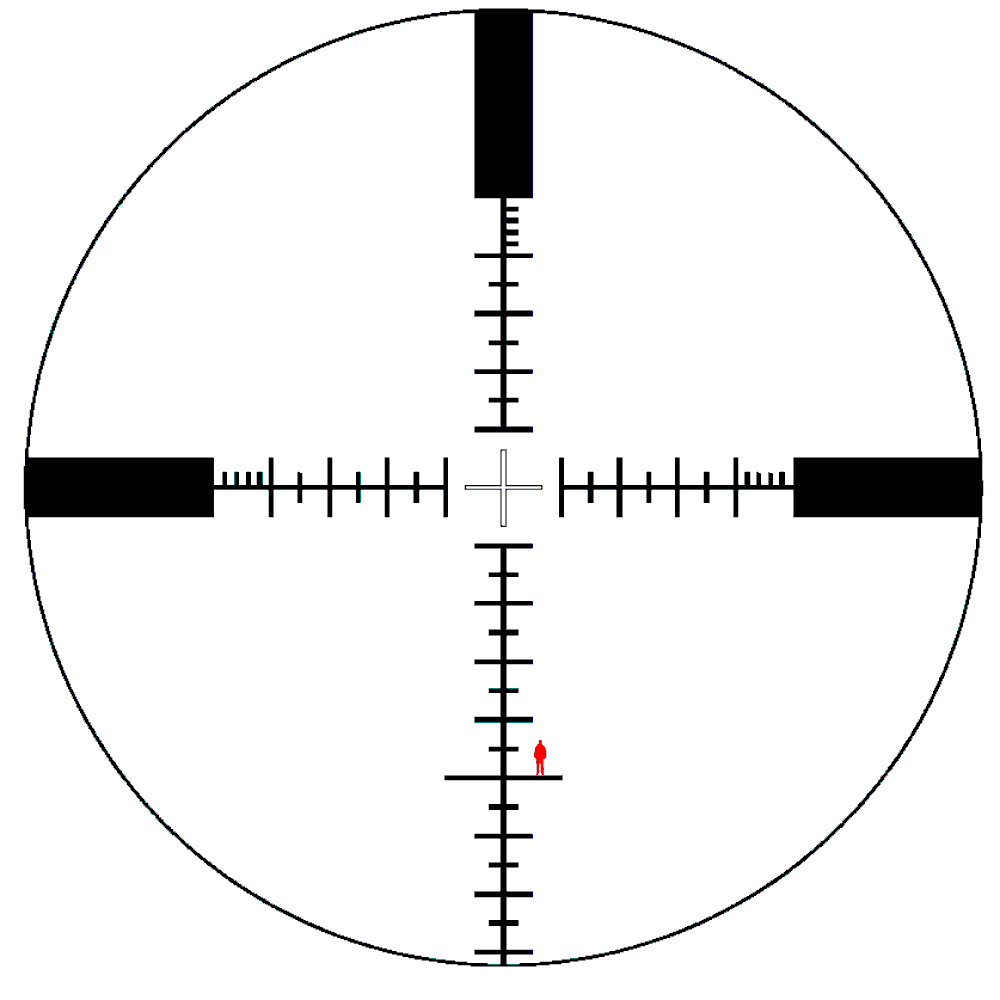
Seen at 25× zoom

The P4 stadiametric rangefinding reticle as used in the Schmidt & Bender 5–25×56 telescopic sight. The small red figure in the images is the silhouette of a man standing at a range of 2,475 m (2,707 yd).

According to JBM Ballistics, using drag coefficients (C_{d}) provided by Lapua, the L115A3 has an approximate supersonic range (Note: speed of sound is 340.3 m/s (1,116 ft/s)) of 1,375 m (1,504 yd) under International Standard Atmosphere conditions at sea level (Note: The density of air (ρ) is 1.225 kg/m^{3}) and 1,548 m (1,693 yd) at the 1,043 m (3,422 ft) altitude (Note: air density of 1.1069 kg/m^{3}) of Musa Qala. This illustrates how differences in environmental conditions can significantly affect bullet flight.

The Schmidt & Bender MILITARY MK II 5–25×56mm scope used by Harrison on the L115A3 Long Range Rifle has windage and elevation adjustment of 0.1 milliradian (mil), double turn elevation turret, and parallax and illumination control. The sight has a maximal vertical elevation range of 26 mil, and the sight adjustment increment of 0.1 mil equates to a 247.5 mm (9.74 in) point of impact shift at a distance of 2,475 m (2,707 yd). To increase the maximal elevation range Accuracy International produces mounts for telescopic sights with a 13.1 mil (45 MOA) built in vertical cant designed for their .338 Lapua Magnum rifles fitted with the 5–25×56 telescopic sight. Even with a 13.1 mil canted mount the employed sighting system is not able to dial in over 39.1 milliradian of vertical aiming correction, which is significantly less than Harrison required during his record shot.

The external ballistics software program by JBM Ballistics predicts that the bullets of British high pressure (Note: over-pressure rounds with pressures and velocities significantly exceeding standard maximums for the cartridge) .338 Lapua Magnum cartridges using 16.2 g (250 gr) Lapua LockBase B408 bullets fired at 936 m/s (3,070 ft/s) muzzle velocity under International Standard Atmosphere conditions at 1,043 m (3,422 ft) elevation (Note: air density (ρ) of 1.1069 kg/m^{3}) assuming shooting and target positions are at equal elevation and a 100 m (110 yd) zero (the distance at which the rifle is sighted in) arrive at 2,475 m (2,707 yd) distance after approximately 6.017 seconds flight time at 251.8 m/s (826 ft/s) velocity and have dropped 120.95 m (396.8 ft) (in angular units 48.9 milliradian, 168 MOA) on their way. Harrison had to use the P4 reticle offering 0.5 mil spaced holdover hash marks in his 5–25×56 telescopic sight to compensate for the lack of vertical aiming correction and thus achieve the required aiming solution. The long horizontal line at 5× zoom or magnification represent 49.1 milliradian (168.6 MOA) or slightly over the required assumed vertical elevation.

== Private life ==
Harrison's father and mother were dog handlers in the Royal Air Force Police (RAFP). They separated when he was very young. Harrison was the younger of two boys. He joined the Household Cavalry at 16, and served in the Blues and Royals. He is married to Tanya and has a daughter.

After returning from Afghanistan in 2009 he developed post-traumatic stress disorder (PTSD) and was discharged from the army in 2014. He has stated since that:

I joined when I was 16 and since all of this has happened I felt abandoned, absolutely abandoned by my regiment. ... I spent 22 years loyal to that regiment, putting my life on the line doing tours, and they just hung me out to dry. My trust in people, the armed forces – it's gone.

The Ministry of Defence paid Harrison £100,000 in compensation for revealing his identity which put him at risk of kidnapping by Al-Qaeda supporters. The blunder led to Harrison being placed on permanent sick leave and then discharged.

Harrison has written The Longest Kill, about his life and career as a sniper.

== Notes ==
Records
Preceded by Rob Furlong	Longest recorded sniper kills 2009–2012; 2,475m (2,707 yd / 1.538 mi); L115A3 w/ 16.2 g (250 gr) Lapua LockBase B408 bullets	Succeeded by Australian Special Forces sniper (name withheld)
