= MCR Horizon's Lord =

Ukrainian anti-materiel rifle capable of penetrating targets at long distances

Horizon's Lord
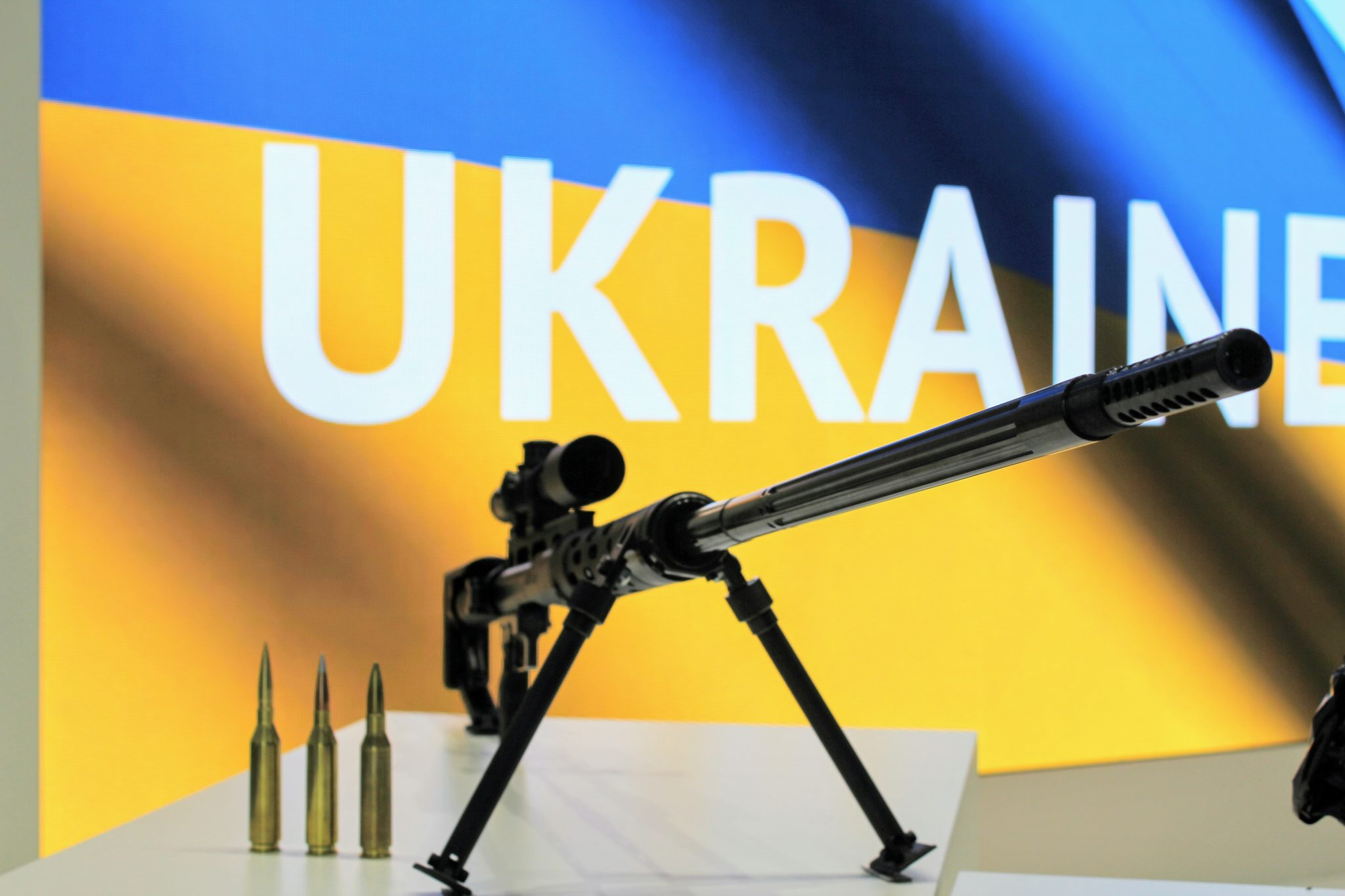
- MCR Horizon's Lord rifle next to 14.5 × 114 mm, 12.7 × 114 HL Hornady A-Max 750gr, and .50 BMG (left to right)
- Type: Anti-materiel rifle
- Place of origin: Ukraine

Service history
- In service: 2022–present
- Used by: Armed Forces of Ukraine
- Wars: Russo-Ukrainian war (2022–present)

Production history
- Manufacturer: Horizon's Lord LLC (Ukrainian: ТОВ «Володар Обрію»)
- Produced: 2022–present

Specifications
- Mass: 15.7–17 kg (34.6–37.5 lb)
- Length: 1.52 m (5 ft 0 in) (folded stock); 1.82 m (6 ft 0 in) (unfolded)
- Cartridge: .50 BMG; 12.7×108mm 12.7×114mmHL; 14.5×114mm 23×115mm
- Muzzle velocity: 1,000 m/s (3,281 ft/s) with a "12.7 × 114 mm HL" cartridge
- Effective firing range: 2,500 m (2,730 yd) with a "12.7 × 114 mm HL" cartridge
- Maximum firing range: Confirmed: 3,800 m (4,160 yd) with a "12.7 × 114 mm HL" cartridge
- Feed system: Single-shot and magazine versions

The MCR Horizon's Lord is a Ukrainian anti-materiel rifle capable of penetrating targets at long distances. It is designed to combat anti-tank guided missiles, heavy caliber machine guns, light armored vehicles, and enemy snipers.

== History ==
The Horizon's Lord is made by the Mayak company which is part of the state enterprise Ukroboronprom, at the Mayak arms factory in Kyiv (not to be confused with the Mayak nuclear facility) under the direction of chief designer Alexander Gordeev.

Mayak was founded in 1924 and made tape recorders and other items. After the declaration of Ukraine's independence, the plant became Ukraine's leading enterprise in the production of communication and recording equipment. In 2015 Mayak began production of a new sniper rifle, the MCR Horizon's Lord.

=== Longest kill ===
A world record for longest sniper kill (3.8 kilometres (2.4 mi)) was set in November 2023 by Viacheslav Kovalskyi while using an MCR Horizon's Lord. Kovalskyi was working for the Security Service of Ukraine in the Russo-Ukrainian War. It was reportedly surpassed in August 2025 with a distance of 4,000 m (4,374 yd) with a Snipex Alligator and 14.5x114mm ammunition by a member of the "Pryvyd" (Ghost Sniper Unit) during the Russo-Ukrainian War.

== Specifications ==
The rifle can be chambered in 12.7×99mm NATO, 12.7×108 mm, 14.5×114 mm, 23×115mm, and its own proprietary cartridge, 12.7×114mmHL; it was created by necking down a 14.5×114mm case to 12.7mm. The round was developed to have the capability of both anti-materiel and anti-personnel engagements.

The creation of this caliber came after multiple proposed cartridges failed to meet the requirements. The first was to use .416 Barrett or .408 CheyTac, both of which failed to meet the anti-materiel requirements. Although both are generally considered to excel at long range anti-personnel engagements, neither had anti-materiel bullet types available. 14.5×114mm was rejected for the opposite problem, its sub-par anti-personnel capabilities. This role would normally be filled by .50 BMG, but its velocity at range was insufficient for the role.

Due to the difficulty of creating an entirely new cartridge and caliber, two existing cartridges would instead be repurposed. By necking down 14.5×114mm down to .50 BMG, 12.7×114mmHL was created, with a muzzle velocity of 3,280 feet per second (1,000 m/s). The MCR Horizon's Lord was also designed to be adaptable in comparison to other similar rifles. It can switch between the previously mentioned calibers on the field, sometimes only requiring a barrel change (depending on which caliber being switched from and to). Unfolded, its length is 71.65 inches (182.0 cm), and 59.84 inches (152.0 cm) folded. Its weight is approximately 34 pounds (15 kg).
