= Staff corporal =

British army rank

Staff corporal (SCpl or S/Cpl) is the equivalent rank to staff sergeant in the Household Cavalry, ranking between corporal of horse and warrant officer class 2. They may hold an appointment such as squadron quartermaster corporal. A staff corporal wears four point-up rank chevrons on his cuff, surmounted by a crown. Staff corporals are in fact addressed as "Corporal-Major" by superiors and usually as "Sir" by subordinates, a holdover from the fact that the rank was originally called troop corporal-major.
