= Corporal of horse =

Military rank of the British Army

- Sleeve insignia
- Country: United Kingdom
- Service branch: Household Cavalry
- Abbreviation: CoH
- Rank group: Senior NCO
- NATO rank code: OR-5/6
- Next higher rank: Staff corporal
- Next lower rank: Lance-corporal of horse
- Equivalent ranks: Sergeant

Corporal of horse (CoH) is a rank in the British Army's Household Cavalry corresponding to sergeant in other regiments. Formerly, no cavalry regiments had sergeants, but the Household Cavalry are the only ones to keep this tradition alive. It is said to stem from the origin of the word sergeant, which comes from the same root as servant. Since even the lowliest trooper in the Household Cavalry was once a gentleman, it was considered that such a rank was inappropriate. The rank of corporal of horse has existed since at least the 1660s, however it was only established as a rank equivalent of sergeant in the Household Cavalry from 1878 onwards. The rank below is Lance-corporal of horse and that above is staff corporal.

A corporal of horse wears three rank chevrons surmounted by a metal crown. in service dress. They are addressed using their full rank title.
