= List of snipers =

A sniper is a trained sharpshooter who operates alone, in a pair, or with a sniper team to maintain close visual contact with a target and engage the targets from concealed positions or distances exceeding the detection capabilities of enemy personnel.

== Military snipers ==
Some notable military snipers include:

Name	Lived	Active	Notes	Confirmed sniper kills	Nationality
Noah Adamia	1919–1942	1938–1942	A Soviet Georgian naval infantryman who is credited with over 200 kills and several tanks knocked out. Trained another 80 snipers within a couple of months during the Second World War.	200+	Soviet Union
Herman Davis	1888–1923	1918	An American sniper of the First World War, awarded the Distinguished Service Cross, the Croix de Guerre with palm, the Croix de Guerre with Gilt Star and the Médaille Militaire awards from the American and French governments.	60	United States
Lucky Bisht	1988–	2003–2024	Indian secret service agent who has had several books published about his life.	139	India
Fedir Dyachenko	1917–1995	1932–1946	A Soviet Ukrainian sniper during World War II, credited with as many as 425 kills and awarded with the Hero of the Soviet Union.	425	Soviet Union
Rob Furlong	1976–	1996–2003	A Canadian Army sniper who held the record for the kill from the greatest distance during Operation Anaconda, War in Afghanistan.	1+	Canada
Gary Gordon	1960–1993	1978–1993	A Delta Force sniper who was posthumously awarded the Medal of Honor for protecting the injured crew of a downed helicopter during the Battle of Mogadishu.	N/A	United States
Craig Harrison	1974-	1990–2014	A British Army sniper who achieved the fourth longest confirmed kill shot in history (2,475 m) using the Accuracy International L115A3 Long Range Rifle.	N/A	United Kingdom
Carlos Hathcock	1942–1999	1959–1979	A renowned United States Marine Corps sniper who is credited with 93 confirmed kills.	93	United States
Dejan Berić	1974-	2014–present	Simply known as Deki (Деки) is a Serbian volunteer in the forces of the Donetsk People's Republic with the rank of Major, who is fighting as a sniper in the ongoing Russo-Ukrainian War.	N/A	Serbia
Simo Häyhä	1905–2002	1939–1940	A Finnish sniper during the 1939–40 Winter War known as the "White Death" from his habit of lying in the snow wearing snow camouflage and a white face mask, waiting for a target to appear. Antti Rantamaa, who served as a field chaplain in Häyhä's regiment, credited him with 259 confirmed kills by sniper rifle and equal number of kills by light machine gun and submachine gun during the war. All of Häyhä's kills were made over the course of fewer than 100 days, before he was seriously wounded—an average of just over 5 per day, with the highest daily count numbering 45 kills—at a time of year with few daylight hours.	500+	Finland
Matthäus Hetzenauer	1924–2004	1943–1945	An Austrian sniper on the Eastern Front during World War II who was credited with 345 kills between 1943 and 1945.	345	Nazi Germany
Abukhadzhi Idrisov	1918–1983	1939–1944	A Soviet Chechen sniper credited with 349+ kills during World War II. He was reported to have killed 100 soldiers in only 10 days of fighting. Awarded multiple of the highest state orders of the Soviet Union.	349+	Soviet Union
Nikolai Ilyin	1925–1943	1941–1943	A Soviet sniper with 494 kills, who fought in the 50th Guards Rifle Division during the Battle of Stalingrad, World War II.	494	Soviet Union
Nicholas Irving	1986–	2004–2010	A sniper nicknamed "The Reaper" with the 3rd Ranger Battalion deployed in Afghanistan in 2009, with 33 confirmed kills.	33	United States
Juba	N/A	2005–2007	Juba (Arabic: جوبا) (also called "Joba") is the pseudonym of an alleged sniper involved in the Iraq War's insurgency. He participated in Iraqi Civil War as well as the 2003 Invasion of Iraq.	63 (confirmed) 700+ (alleged)	Iraq
Ivan Kulbertinov	1917–1993	1941–1945	A Russian Soviet sniper credited with 252, or alternatively 487 kills using a Mosin-Nagant 1891 rifle during the Second World War.	252	Soviet Union
Vasil Kvachantiradze	1907–1950	1941–1945	A Soviet Georgian sniper who is credited with 534 kills during World War II, one of the highest Soviet kill counts. Known for almost single-handedly thwarting a German assault on Shumilino in Belarus.	534	Soviet Union
Chris Kyle	1974–2013	1999–2009	A US Navy SEAL credited with 160 confirmed kills by the Pentagon, but who allegedly killed 255.	160 (confirmed); 255 (alleged)	United States
Marie Ljalková	1920–2011	1942–1953	A Czech sniper fighting in the Soviet Army during World War II who was credited with at least 30 confirmed kills.	30+	Czechoslovakia
Chuck Mawhinney	1949–2024	1967–1970	A United States Marine Corps sniper who holds the record for most confirmed kills by a US Marine (103 kills), with an additional 216 "probable kills".	103 - 319	United States
Timothy Murphy	1751–1818	1775–1780	An American Revolutionary War sniper credited with killing British General Simon Fraser during the Battle of Saratoga.	1+	United States
Semyon Nomokonov	1900–1973	1941–1945	A Soviet Russian World War II sniper with 367 logged kills.	367	Soviet Union
Henry Norwest	1884–1918	1915–1918	A sniper in the 50th Battalion (Calgary), CEF during the First World War. He had 115 confirmed kills and was killed by a German sniper on 18 August 1918.	115	Canada
Fyodor Okhlopkov	1908–1968	1941–1945	A Russian Soviet sniper credited with 423 confirmed kills during World War II.	423	Soviet Union
Johnson Paudash	1875–1959	1914–1918	A member of the 21st Battalion (Eastern Ontario), CEF during World War One who made 88 confirmed kills.	88	Canada
Lyudmila Pavlichenko	1916–1974	1941–1953	The most successful female sniper of all time, during World War II she served in the Soviet army and had 309 confirmed kills. Pavlichenko was called "Lady Death" for her ability with a sniper rifle. She served in the Red Army during the siege of Odesa and the siege of Sevastopol. She was awarded Hero of the Soviet Union	309	Soviet Union
Vladimir Pchelintsev	1919–2001	1941–1945	A Soviet sniper credited with 152 kills using a Mosin-Nagant 1891 rifle during the Second World War.	152	Soviet Union
Francis Pegahmagabow	1891–1952	1914–1919	An Ojibwe sniper in World War I who is credited with 378 kills, and an unknown number of unconfirmed kills.	378	Canada
Friedrich Pein	1915–1975	1943–1945	An Austrian fighting in the German Army credited with over 200 kills on the Eastern Front between 1943 and 1945 during the Second World War.	200+	Nazi Germany
Stepan Petrenko	1922–1984	1941–1945	A Soviet sniper during the Second World War with 422 confirmed kills, awarded the HSU (Hero of the Soviet Union).	422	Soviet Union
Ranjith Premasiri Madalana (Nero)	1969–2009	2000–2009	A sniper in the Sri Lanka Army during the country's civil war alias "Nero". The Sri Lankan LTTE war ended on 18 May 2009 just 20 days after Corporal Premasiri's death. At the time of his death, he had served 18 years in the Sri Lanka Army and 9 years of it as a sniper with 217 confirmed kills of Tamil Tigers.	217	Sri Lanka
Graham Ragsdale	1969–	1988–2003	A former Canadian Army sniper who fought in Afghanistan in 2002 and 2005–2014 as a designated defensive marksman with private military companies.	56	Canada
Ben Roberts-Smith	1978–	1996–2015	A sniper with the Australian Special Air Service Regiment who was awarded the Medal of Gallantry for his actions in 2006 during Operation Perth in the Chora Valley of Oruzgan Province, Afghanistan. Subsequently, awarded the Victoria Cross for Australia in 2011.	N/A	Australia
Roza Shanina	1924–1945	1943–1945	A Russian Soviet sniper during the Second World War, credited with 60 kills, including 12 soldiers during the Battle of Vilnius in 1944.	60	Soviet Union
Ivan Sidorenko	1919–1994	1939–1945	A Soviet sniper credited with over 500 kills during the Second World War.	500+	Soviet Union
Billy Sing	1886–1943	1914–1918	An Australian First World War sniper credited with over 150 confirmed kills. Contemporary evidence puts his tally at close to 300 kills.	150+	Australia
Mikhail Surkov	1921–1953	1941–1945	A Soviet sniper in World War II. Official documents indicate a tally around 236 kills, although newspapers inflated his tally to over 700 kills.	236	Soviet Union
Bruno Sutkus	1924–2003	1944–1945	A Lithuanian sniper fighting in the German Army during the Second World War. He was credited with 209 kills on the Eastern Front between 1944 and 1945.	209	Nazi Germany
Abu Tahsin al-Salhi	1953–2017	1973–2017	A sniper who fought in the Yom Kippur War, Iran–Iraq War, invasion of Kuwait, Gulf War, as well as the 2003 Invasion of Iraq. However, his kills in other wars other than against ISIS are unaccounted for and unknown.	341+ (against ISIS only) (Alleged)	Iraq
Trịnh Tố Tâm	1945–1996	1966–1973	A member of the People's Army of Vietnam	272	North Vietnam
Alvin York	1887–1964	1917–1918	An expert sharpshooter with the 82nd Infantry Division who used an M1917 Enfield rifle during the Meuse–Argonne offensive near Chatel-Chéhéry, France, 1918 in World War I. Medal of Honor recipient for leading an assault on machine gun positions.	28	United States
Vasily Zaytsev	1915–1991	1937–1945	A Soviet sniper who fought at the Battle of Stalingrad. Zaytsev is credited with 242 kills (including 11 snipers).	242	Soviet Union
Zhang Taofang	1931–2007	1953–1985	A Chinese sniper who fought in the Korean War with 214 confirmed kills over 32 days.	214	China
Ibragim Suleymanov	1911 – 1943	1941–1943	A Kazakh sniper in the Red Army during World War II who killed an estimated 289 enemy soldiers. He was nominated for the title Hero of the Soviet Union on 9 July 1943, but was initially awarded only the Order of Lenin. In 2022 he was posthumously awarded the title Hero of Kazakhstan, the highest state honor of Kazakhstan.	289	Soviet Union

== Police and federal snipers ==
Name	Lived	Notes	Kills	Nationality
Lon Horiuchi	1954–	A Federal Bureau of Investigation sniper who shot Randy Weaver and shot and killed Vicki Weaver at Ruby Ridge.	1	United States
Thomas "Tom" Horn Jr.	1860–1903	An American Old West lawman, scout, and hired gunman, known for shooting cattle rustlers and sheepherders at long range with a Sharps rifle.	17 (believed)	United States

== Civilian snipers ==
Not all snipers are highly trained professional soldiers. The term is sometimes ambiguously used to describe criminals firing from cover at long range with a rifle. Some civilian snipers include:

Name	Lived	Notes	Kills	Nationality
Frank Carter	1881–1927	A notorious murderer in Omaha, Nebraska, who claimed to have murdered 43 victims.	43 (claimed); 2 (confirmed)	United States
Michael Andrew Clark	1949-1965	Michael Andrew Clark, A 16-year-old teenage sniper who killed three and wounded ten in Highway 101 shooting spree on 25 April 1965.	3	United States
Byron De La Beckwith	1920–2001	An ex-US Marine and white supremacist, assassinated NAACP field secretary Medgar Evers after the civil rights activist arrived home in Jackson, Mississippi on 12 June 1963.	1	United States
William "Billy" Dixon	1850–1913	Defended the Adobe Walls settlement against Native American attack with his legendary buffalo rifle, and was one of eight civilians in United States history to receive the Medal of Honor.	N/A	United States
Tha'ir Kayid Hamad	1980–	A Palestinian sniper who was responsible for the Wadi al-Haramiya sniper attack with a WWII-era M1 Garand rifle during the Second Intifada in 2002. Israeli sources claim he killed 10 soldiers and settlers and injured 6 others, while Palestinian sources claim he killed 11 soldiers and injured 9 others. He would be arrested two years later and sentenced to life imprisonment.	10	Palestine
Jack Hinson	1807–1874	A farmer who engaged Union troops at long range during the American Civil War and recorded 36 officer "kills" on his custom-made .50 caliber Kentucky long rifle with iron sights.	36 (recorded)	United States
John Allen Muhammad and Lee Boyd Malvo	1960–2009; 1985–	Perpetrators of the Beltway sniper attacks, a series of coordinated shootings that took place over three weeks in October 2002 in Maryland, Virginia, and Washington, D.C. Ten people were killed and three other victims were critically injured in several locations throughout the Washington, D.C. metropolitan area and along Interstate 95 in Virginia.	10	United States
Lee Harvey Oswald	1939–1963	A former US Marine who assassinated President John F. Kennedy and shot Governor John Connally in Dallas, Texas on 22 November 1963, and shot at General Edwin Walker on 10 April 1963.	2	United States
Stephen Paddock	1953–2017	Perpetrator of the 2017 Las Vegas shooting using multiple high-powered modified rifles from the 32nd floor of a high-rise hotel, killing 60 people and wounding over 800 others on 1 October 2017.	60	United States
Charles Whitman	1941–1966	A college student and former US Marine who fired from a clock tower on the University of Texas Austin campus, killing 14 and wounding 32 on 1 August 1966.	14	United States

== See also ==
- Snipers of the Soviet Union

== Sources ==
- Scherzer, Veit [in German] (2007). Ritterkreuzträger 1939–1945 [The Knight's Cross Bearers 1939–1945] (in German) (2nd ed.). Ranis: Verlag Veit Scherzer. ISBN 978-3-938845-17-2. OCLC 891773959. Wikidata Q131160320.
