= Dhan Singh Thapa =

Indian Army officer, recipient of Param Vir Chakra

Lieutenant colonel Dhan Singh Thapa PVC
- Born: 28 April 1928; Simla, Punjab Province, British India (present day Shimla, Himachal Pradesh, India)
- Died: 6 September 2005 (aged 77); Pune, Maharashtra, India
- Military career
- Allegiance: India
- Branch: Indian Army
- Service years: 1949–1980
- Rank: Lieutenant Colonel
- Service number: IC-7990
- Unit: 1/8 Gorkha Rifles
- Conflicts: Sino-Indian War
- Awards: Param Vir Chakra

Dhan Singh Thapa PVC (28 April 1928 – 6 September 2005) was an Indian military officer and recipient of the Param Vir Chakra, India's highest military decoration. He was commissioned into the 1st Battalion, 8 Gorkha Rifles in 1949.

The Sino-Indian War began in October 1962; on 21 October, the Chinese advanced to north of Pangong Lake with the objective of capturing Sirijap and Yula. Srijap 1 was a post established on the northern bank of Pangong Lake by the 1st Battalion of 8th Gorkha Rifles and was commanded by Major Dhan Singh Thapa. Soon the post was surrounded by well armed Chinese forces. Major Thapa and his men held the post and repelled three attacks before eventually being overrun. The survivors, including Thapa, were taken as prisoners of war. For his gallant actions and his efforts to motivate his men under fire he was awarded the Param Vir Chakra.

Thapa was released from captivity after the war ended. Following retirement from the Army, he worked for a brief period with Sahara Airlines. He died on 6 September 2005.

== Early life ==
Dhan Singh Thapa was born to Padam Singh Thapa on 28 April 1928, in a Khas Chhetri Gorkha Family in Shimla, Himachal Pradesh. He joined the 1st Battalion, 8 Gorkha Rifles on 28 August 1949, and received a temporary commission as a second lieutenant on 21 February 1951, with promotion to lieutenant on 21 February 1953. He received a permanent commission as a lieutenant on 29 September 1956, and was promoted to captain on 21 February 1957.

== Military career ==
=== 1962 Sino-Indian War ===
There had long been disagreement between India and China over borders in the Himalaya region. To counter the increasing Chinese intrusions into disputed territory, then Prime Minister of India Jawaharlal Nehru approved a plan called the "Forward Policy", which called for the establishment of a number of small posts facing the Chinese.

On the night of 19–20 October 1962, they attacked the eastern sector of the Indian defences. The same night they assaulted and overran the posts at Galwan, Chip Chap, and Pangong areas of Ladakh. On 21 October, they advanced to north of Pangong Lake, with the objective of capturing Sirijap and Yula.

==== Battle at Srijap ====
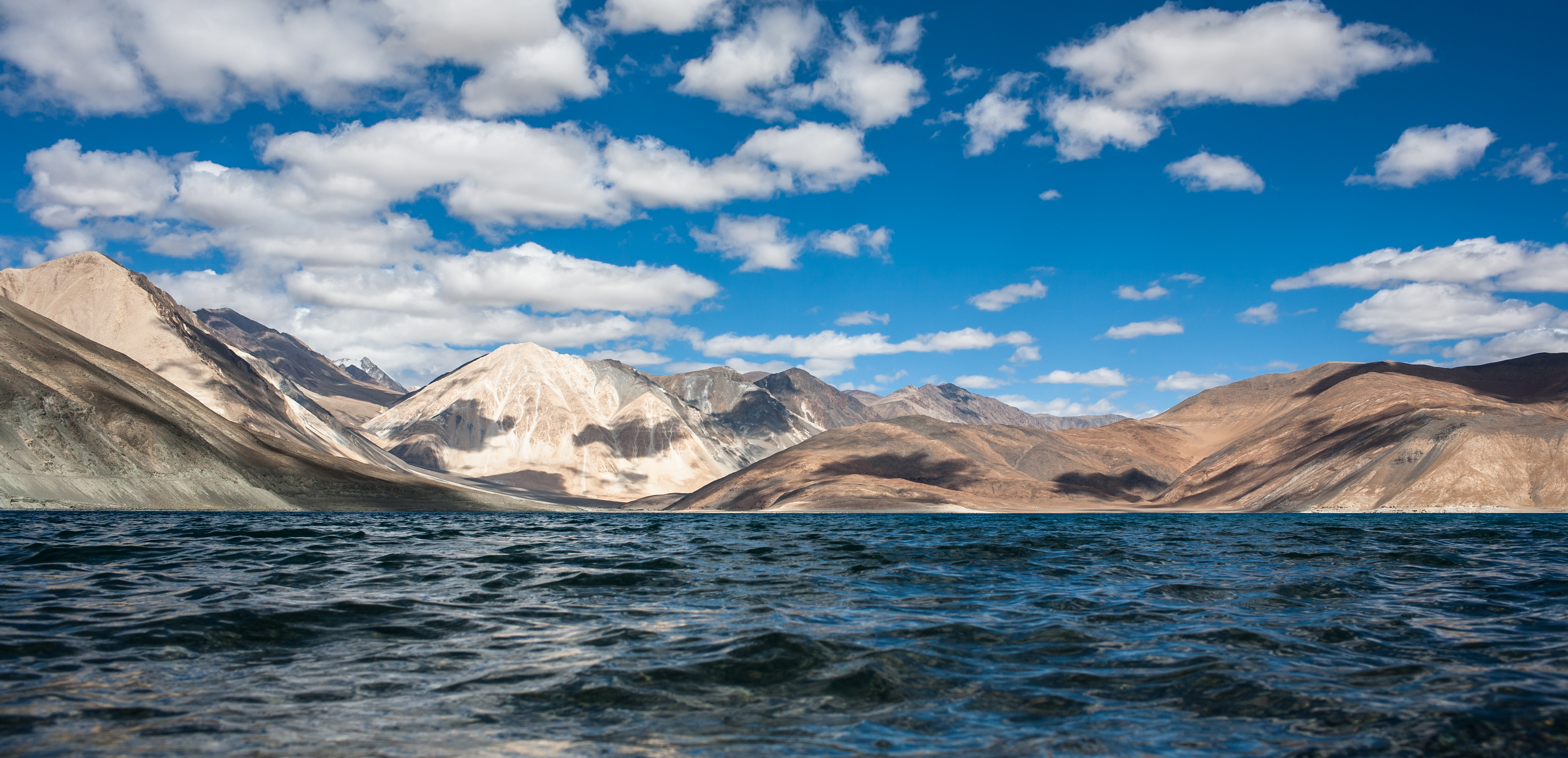
Pangong lake

The post Srijap 1 was established on the northern bank of Pangong lake by the 1st Battalion, 8 Gorkha Rifles. It was part of the series of posts created to implement the "Forward Policy". The post was strategically important for the defence of Chusul airfield. D Company of the 1st Battalion, under the command of Major Dhan Singh Thapa, was tasked to man the post, and was responsible for an area of 48 square kilometres (19 square miles). As there were a number of other posts to be established, only 28 men of D company were present to hold Srijap 1. Meanwhile, the Chinese set up three posts around it.

On 19 October 1962, with the arrival of heavy infantry troops, the strength of Chinese forces around Srijap 1 witnessed a drastic increase. This caused Thapa to anticipate an attack; he ordered his troops to "dig fast and dig deep". As expected, the Chinese launched their first attack with artillery and mortar fire at 4:30 am on 20 October. This lasted for two and a half hours, providing good cover for their infantry, who moved towards the post. By the time the shelling ended, around 600 Chinese troops had closed to within 150 yards (140 m) of the rear of the post. On sighting the Chinese, the Gorkhas immediately started firing with light machine guns (LMG) and rifles, killing a large number of Chinese. The attack broke up 100 yards (91 m) from the post. The Chinese artillery caused many casualties on the Indian side. It also destroyed the communications of D Company with the rest of the battalion.

Thapa, with his second-in-command, Subedar Min Bahadur Gurung, continuously moved from place to place, adjusting the defences and boosting the soldiers' morale. As time passed, the Chinese, with the help of artillery cover, reached as close as 50 yards (46 m) from the post. To smoke out the Indians the Chinese started attacking the post with incendiary bombs. The Gorkhas countered with hand grenades and small arms fire. Subedar Gurung, who was manning an LMG, was buried when a bunker collapsed on top him. He pulled himself out of the debris and recommenced LMG fire, inflicting heavy casualties among the Chinese until eventually being killed.

By then, the post only had seven men left, with Thapa still holding the command. The next Chinese wave came in with heavy machine guns and rocket launchers. At this point, the post was also attacked from the lake side by amphibious craft, each armed with a heavy machine gun. In the meantime two storm boats which had been sent by battalion headquarters to find out the status of Srijap 1 reached the location. Both boats were fired upon by the Chinese. One sank, and the other was badly damaged. All the occupants of the first boat died, but the second boat with Naik Rabilal Thapa managed to escape.

By that time, after a third Chinese attack, by tanks, the post was left with only three men. A bomb fell into Thapa's bunker, but he managed to escape the fire and came out. Though his ammunition was exhausted, he jumped into the trenches and killed many intruders in hand-to-hand combat before he was overpowered and taken prisoner. At battalion headquarters, Naik Thapa reported that Srijap 1 had fallen with no survivors. Unbeknownst to him, the last three survivors had been taken prisoner. Of these, Rifleman Tulsi Ram Thapa managed to escape the Chinese and rejoined the battalion. It was not known until much later that Major Thapa had been taken prisoner by the Chinese.

=== Prisoner of war ===
Thapa was treated poorly as a prisoner of war. Against military convention he was forced to undergo a series of punishments: firstly for killing Chinese troops, and secondly for refusing to make statements against the Indian Army and the Indian government. He was released after the war ended in November 1962.

=== Param Vir Chakra ===
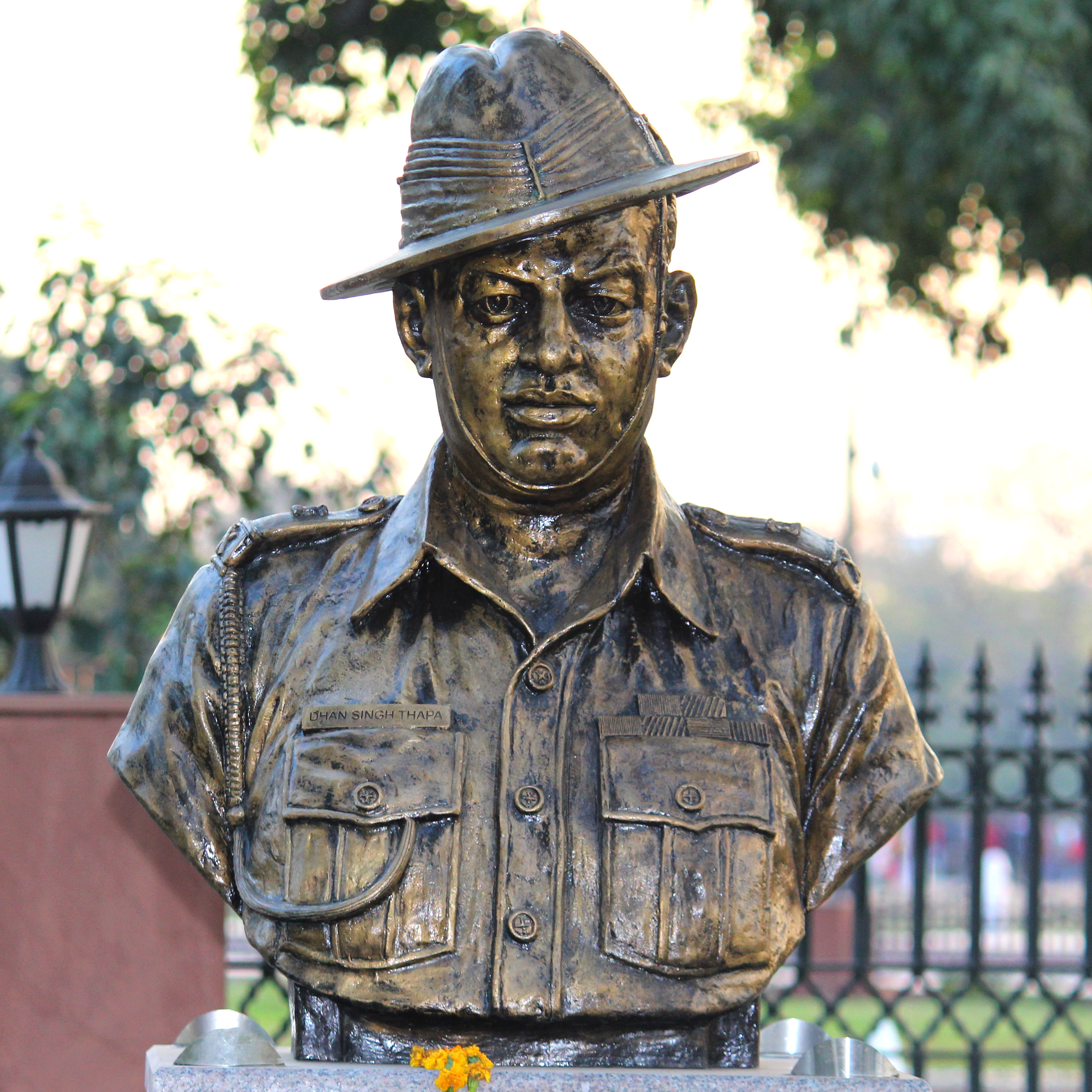
Thapa's statue at Param Yodha Sthal, National War Memorial, New Delhi

For his gallant actions on 20 October 1962, Thapa was awarded the Param Vir Chakra. (Note: Though it was later found that Thapa was alive, when the award was conferred, he was considered dead, i.e. it was a posthumous award.) The award citation read:

Major Dhan Singh Thapa was in command of a forward post in Ladakh. On 20 October it was attacked by the Chinese in overwhelming strength after being subjected to intensive artillery and mortar bombardment. Under his gallant command, the greatly outnumbered post repulsed the attack, inflicting heavy casualties on the aggressors. The enemy attacked again in greater numbers after heavy shelling by artillery and mortar fire. Under the leadership of Major Thapa, his men repulsed this attack also with heavy losses to the enemy. The Chinese attacked for the third time, now with tanks to support the infantry. The post had already suffered large numbers of casualties in the earlier two attacks. Though considerably reduced in number it held out to the last. When it was finally overrun by overwhelming numbers of the enemy, Major Thapa got out of his trench and killed several of the enemy in hand-to-hand fighting before he was finally overpowered by Chinese soldiers. Major Thapa’s cool courage, conspicuous fighting qualities and leadership were in the highest traditions of our Army.

— Gazette of India Notification No.68—Press/62, (Cardozo 2003, p. 78)

== Later life ==
Thapa was promoted to the substantive rank of major on 21 February 1964, and to lieutenant-colonel on 28 February 1970. He retired from the Army on 30 April 1980. Post-retirement, Thapa settled down in Lucknow, and served for a brief period as a director with Sahara Airlines.

On 6 September 2005, Thapa died. He was survived by his wife, Shukla Thapa, and three children.

== Dhan Singh Thapa Post ==
The Indian Military's permanent border outpost near the Finger-3 spur of the Changchenmo Range on the northern bank of Pangong Tso is named the Dan Singh Thapa Post in the honor of Dan Singh Thapa. In 2022, the ITBP was manning the post.

== Other honours ==
In 1980s, the Shipping Corporation of India (SCI), a Government of India enterprise under the aegis of the Ministry of Shipping, named fifteen of its crude oil tankers in honour of the PVC recipients. The tanker MT Major Dhan Singh Thapa, PVC was delivered to SCI in 1984, and served for 25 years before being phased out. The Eden Gardens in Kolkata have a stand named after him.

== See also ==
- Baba Harbhajan Singh Temple and bunker
- Bana Singh Post
- Jaswant Singh Rawat's Memorial at Sela La
- Lucky Bisht

== Notes ==
Footnotes

Citations
