= Kuka =

Kuka may refer to:

- Pavel Kuka (b. 1968), former Czech association football player
- KUKA, a German-based manufacturer of industrial robots
- KUKA (FM), a radio station licensed to Driscoll, Texas, United States
- Kuka, the Namdhari sect of Sikhism
- Kuka people, an ethnic group in Chad
- Kuka (Višegrad), a village in Bosnia and Herzegovina
- Kuka, Punjab, a village in Punjab, India
- Kuka, Russia, several rural localities in Chitinsky District of Zabaykalsky Krai, Russia
- Kuka, former name of Kukawa, a town in Borno State, Nigeria

== See also ==
- Namdhari, sect of Sikhism
