= Premasiri =

Premasiri is both a given name and a surname. Notable people with the name include:

- Premasiri Khemadasa (1937–2008), Sri Lankan music composer
- Halambage Premasiri (1962–2016), Sri Lankan cricketer
- Lionel Premasiri, Sri Lankan politician
- P. D. Premasiri (born 1941), Sri Lankan Buddhist scholar
- Ranjith Premasiri Madalana, Sri Lanka Army sniper
