= Sutkus =

Sutkus is the masculine form of a Lithuanian surname. Its feminine forms are: Sutkienė (married woman or widow) and Sutkutė (unmarried woman). Notable people with the surname include:

- Antanas Sutkus (born 1939), Lithuanian photographer
- Bruno Sutkus (1924–2003), German sniper
