= Baba Harbhajan Singh =

Indian Army soldier

Sepoy/Captain "Baba" Baba Harbhajan Singh
- Born: 30 August 1946 Sardarpura Faislabad Punjab, British India
- Died: 4 October 1968 (aged 22); South-east Sikkim
- Military career
- Rank: Sepoy/ Captain (Honorary)
- Service number: 2456687
- Unit: 23 Punjab Regiment

Baba Harbhajan Singh (Note: He is often confused with Major Harbhajan Singh who was martyred in battle at the 14,500 feet (4,400 m) Nathu La, a mountain pass between Tibet and Sikkim where many battles took place between the Indian Army and the PLA during the 1967 Chino-Indian war.) (1946–1968) was an Indian Army soldier who served from 30 June 1965 to 4 October 1968. He is said to serve the Indian Army even after his death by coming in dreams of soldiers and telling them the plans of their enemies. There is a temple dedicated to him in East Sikkim.

== Life and military career ==
Harbhajan Singh was born into a Sikh family on 30 August 1946 in the village of Sardarpura Distt Faislabad (now in Pakistan). He completed his preliminary education at a village school, and then matriculated from DAV High School in Patti, Punjab, in March 1965. He enlisted as a soldier in Amritsar and joined the Punjab Regiment (India).

== Death, legacy and associated legend ==
Singh died in 1968 near the Nathu La (pass) in eastern Sikkim, India. A board besides his shrine describes that he died after falling into a nullah while escorting a mule column from Tuku La to Dongchui La.

Harbhajan Singh's early death at the age of 22 is the subject of legend and religious veneration that has become popular among Indian Army regulars (jawans), the people of his village and apparently soldiers of the Chinese People's Liberation Army (PLA) across the border guarding the Indo-Chinese border between Sikkim and Tibet.

Baba Harbhajan Singh memorial and shrine
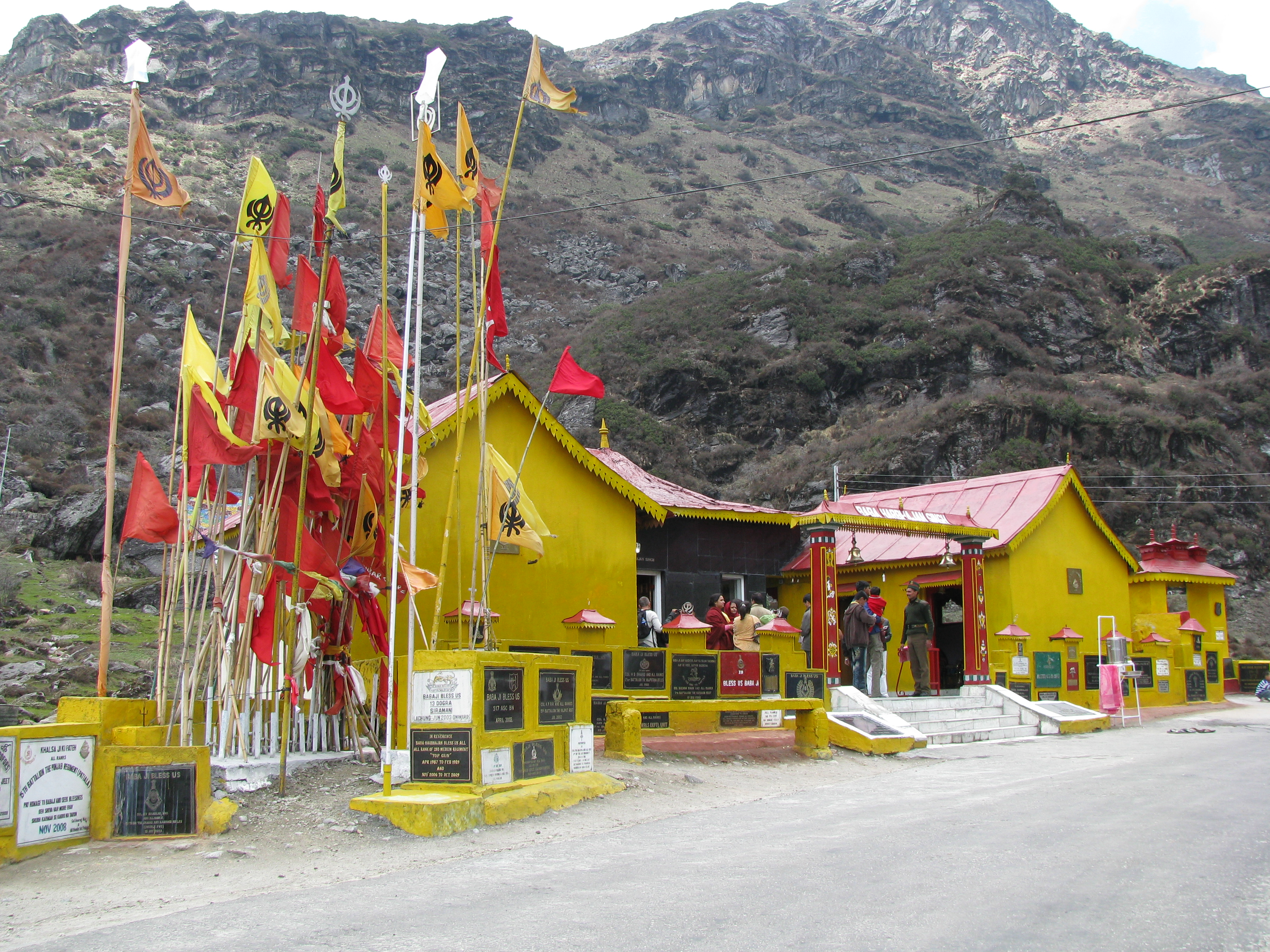
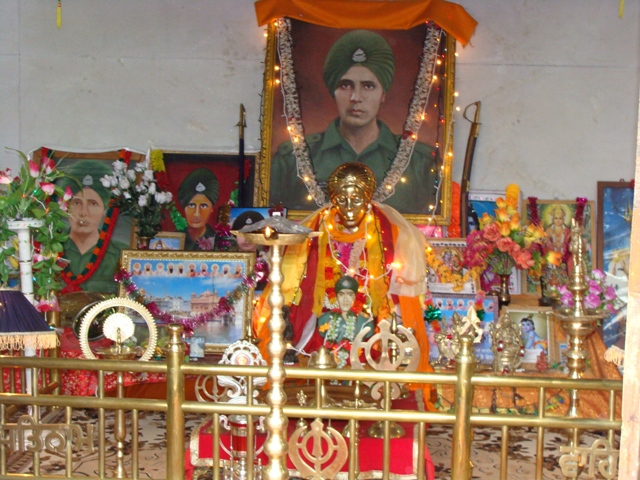
- Interactive map of Baba Harbhajan Singh memorial and shrine
- Location: On the route between Sherathang and Kupup (NH 717B), Sikkim, India
- Coordinates: 27.36587°N 88.83790°E

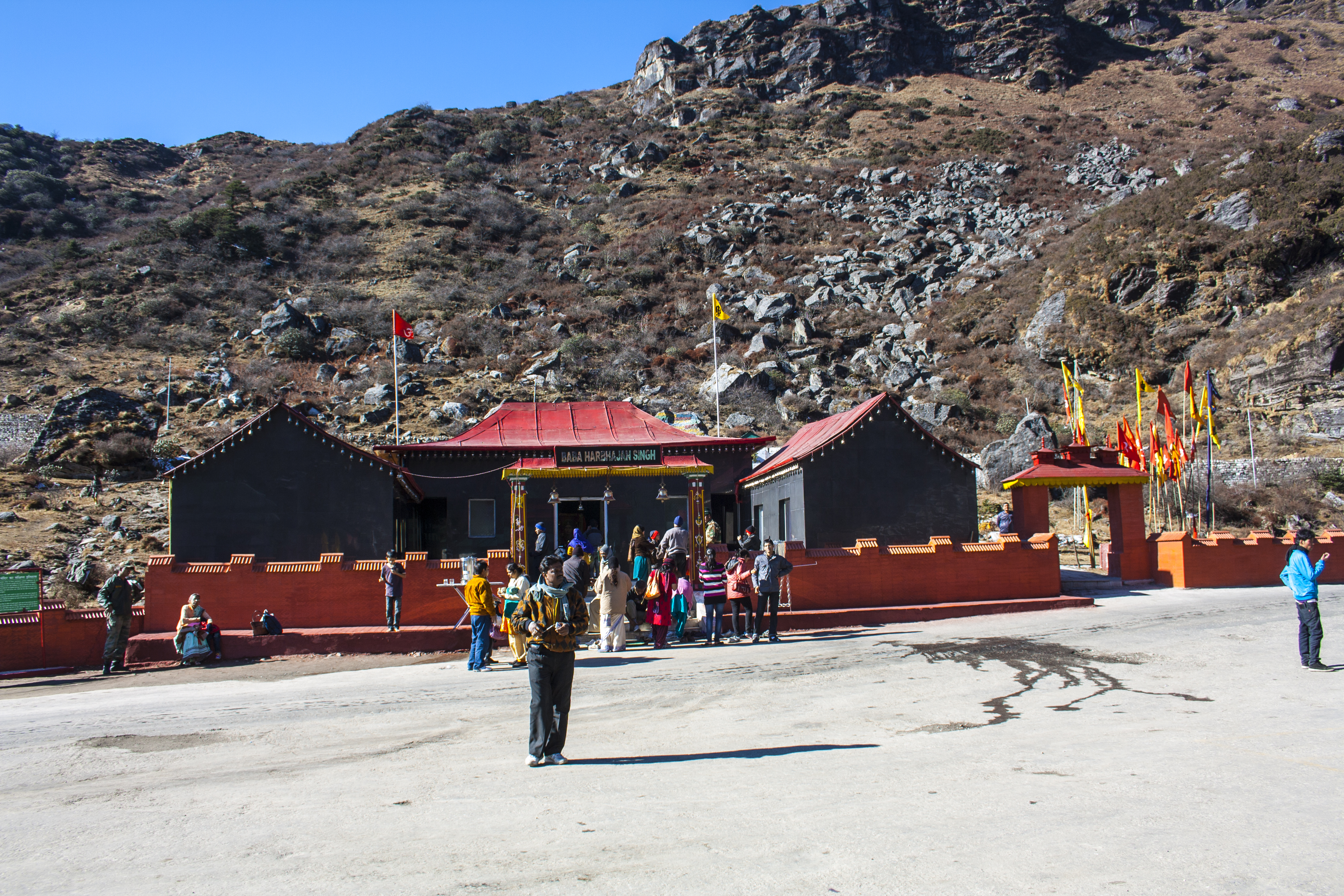
Plaque at Baba Harbhajan Singh's shrine.

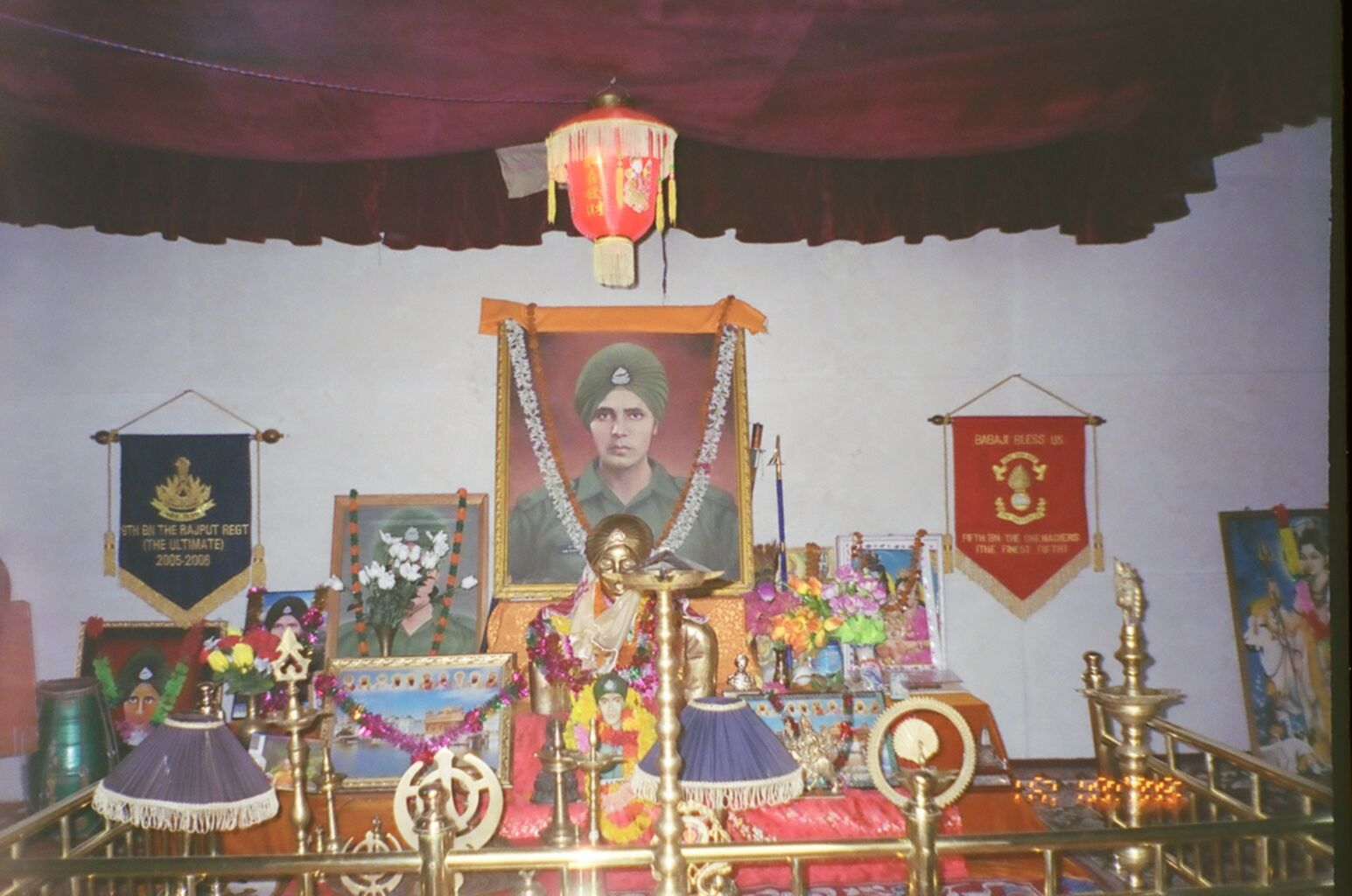
Baba Harbhajan Singh mandir

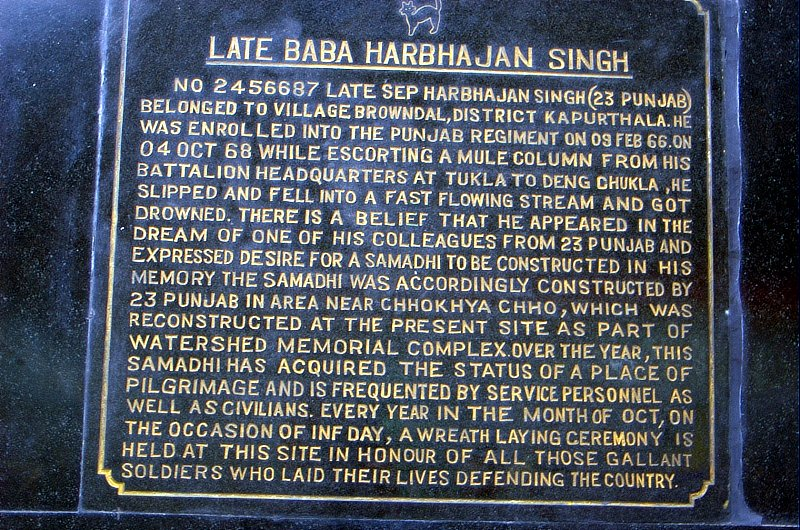
Plaque at Baba Harbhajan Singh's shrine.

He has come to be known as "Saint Baba". Every year on 11 September, a jeep departs with his personal belongings to the nearest railway station, New Jalpaiguri, from where it is then sent by train to the village of Kuka, in the Kapurthala district of the Indian state of Punjab. While empty berths on any train of the Indian Railways are invariably allocated to any waitlisted passenger or on a first-come-first-served basis by the coach attendants, a special reservation for the Baba is made. Every year a seat is left empty for the journey to his hometown and three soldiers accompany the Baba to his home. A small sum of money is contributed by soldiers posted in Nathula to be sent to his mother each month and his village still remembers him as martyr and undertook the initiative to help his family.

== Temples ==
There are 2 temples in Sikkim near Nathu La dedicated to Baba Harbhajan Singh.

- Baba Harbhajan Singh Temple near Nathu La: on NH-717B between Sherathang-Kupup, south of Nathu La and east of Abhin Tal lake. Sherathang War Memorial lies off NH-717B north of Abhin Tal.
- Old Harbhajan Babaji Mandir and Bunker: the older temple at the place where Baba Harbhajan Singh has his bunker too where he was deployed. It lies road between Tukla La and Heart Lake (Khecheopalri Lake). This temple is few km south of the newer temple above.

== In popular culture ==
Bhuvan Bam and Divya Dutta came together for a short-film, Plus Minus (2018), which was loosely based on Singh's life and legacy. The film was directed by Jyoti Kapur Das. It won the Best Short Film at the 64th Filmfare Awards.

== See also ==
- Bana Singh Post
- Dhan Singh Thapa Post
- Jaswant Singh Rawat's Memorial at Sela La
- Lucky Bisht
