= Katyusha (video game) =

- Developer: Loresoft
- Publisher: Loresoft
- Designer: Manos Gryparis
- Platforms: Microsoft Windows, macOS, Linux
- Genres: Platform, role-playing
- Mode: Single-player

Katyusha is an upcoming 2D platform role-playing game developed and published by the Greek independent studio Loresoft. Set during World War II on the Eastern Front, the game follows a young Russian woman named Katyusha who searches for her missing boyfriend after he is deployed to the front lines. The game is inspired by the Soviet wartime song of the same name.

== Gameplay ==
Players control Katyusha in side-scrolling levels set during historical battles of the Eastern Front. The game incorporates elements of melee combat, ranged weapons, stealth, crafting, an in-game economy, and a leveling progression system. Katyusha is accompanied by a steppe eagle companion that assists in combat; the eagle's capabilities improve as the player invests points into the Intelligence attribute. Checkpoints throughout the game take the form of mailboxes, referencing the letters sent between the protagonists in the original song. Historical figures of World War II, including Soviet sniper Lyudmila Pavlichenko and Marshal Konstantin Rokossovsky, appear as non-player characters (NPCs). The game also features a "Memories" mechanic that allows players to play through flashback sequences controlling various historical figures.

== Development ==
Development began in 2017 by Greek studio Loresoft. A playable alpha demo was released on Steam, where it accumulated over 20,000 downloads. In 2018, the game was a runner-up in the Nordic Game Discovery Contest (Season III) held at the Athens Games Festival. An early beta version featuring the first two historical levels (Smolensk and Odessa) was scheduled for release in late 2026. A standalone soundtrack album featuring 17 orchestral rearrangements of World War II-era songs was released on Steam in December 2022.

== Reception ==
While the full game remains unreleased, the early demo and preview builds received coverage from gaming publications including Pocket Gamer.
