= Stepan Petrenko =

Ukrainian sniper, Hero of the Soviet Union (1922–1984)

- Степан Васильевич Петренко
- Born: 23 June 1922; Zaderievka, Ukrainian SSR
- Died: 6 April 1984 (aged 61); Zaderievka, Ripky Raion, Ukrainian SSR, USSR
- Military career
- Allegiance: Soviet Union
- Branch: Red Army
- Service years: 1941–1955
- Rank: Senior lieutenant
- Unit: 59th Guards Rifle Regiment
- Conflicts: World War II
- Awards: Hero of the Soviet Union

Stepan Vasilyevich Petrenko (Russian: Степан Васильевич Петренко; 23 June 1922 — 6 April 1984) was one of the top Soviet snipers in World War II. He killed 422 enemy soldiers by mid September 1944 and was awarded the title Hero of the Soviet Union on 24 March 1945. He is considered as one of the deadliest snipers in history.

== Early life ==
Petrenko was born on 23 June 1922 to a Ukrainian peasant family in Zaderievka. He worked on a collective farm after completing secondary school.

== World War II ==
After being conscripted into the Red Army in 1941 he was sent to the warfront. However, he went to the rear to attend the Rubtsov Military Infantry School. After graduating in 1942 he honed his sharpshooting skills, becoming well known in his unit for his marksmanship. Eventually he was given an official sniper rifle in August, and he did very well in training. By the third day of training he hit ten out of ten stationary targets. He went on his first sniper hunt in Nevel. He quickly killed many Nazis in the battles for many areas. 42 of his kills were of machine gunners, and 12 were enemy snipers that he dueled with. He did not stay away from direct combat; during the battle for the Drissa River he was one of the first in his group to cross the river. After crossing the river he began firing on enemy soldiers to make it easier for Soviet paratroopers to advance. Despite being wounded in the battle he kept on fighting, personally killing 23 enemy soldiers in the engagement. By the time he was nominated for the title Hero of the Soviet Union in September 1944, he killed 422 enemies in addition to training 17 young snipers. His total body count is unknown.

== Later life ==
Remaining in the army after the war, he graduated from the Moscow Military-Political School in 1946. After retiring with the rank of senior lieutenant in 1955 he returned to his hometown, where he worked as a military instructor at a secondary school. He died on 6 April 1984.

== Awards ==
- Hero of the Soviet Union (23 March 1945)
- Order of Lenin (23 March 1945)
- Order of the Patriotic War 1st class (13 July 1944)
- Order of the Red Star (20 July 1943)
- Medal "For Courage" (10 March 1943)
