= Sniper's Badge =

Sniper's Badge Scharfschützenabzeichen
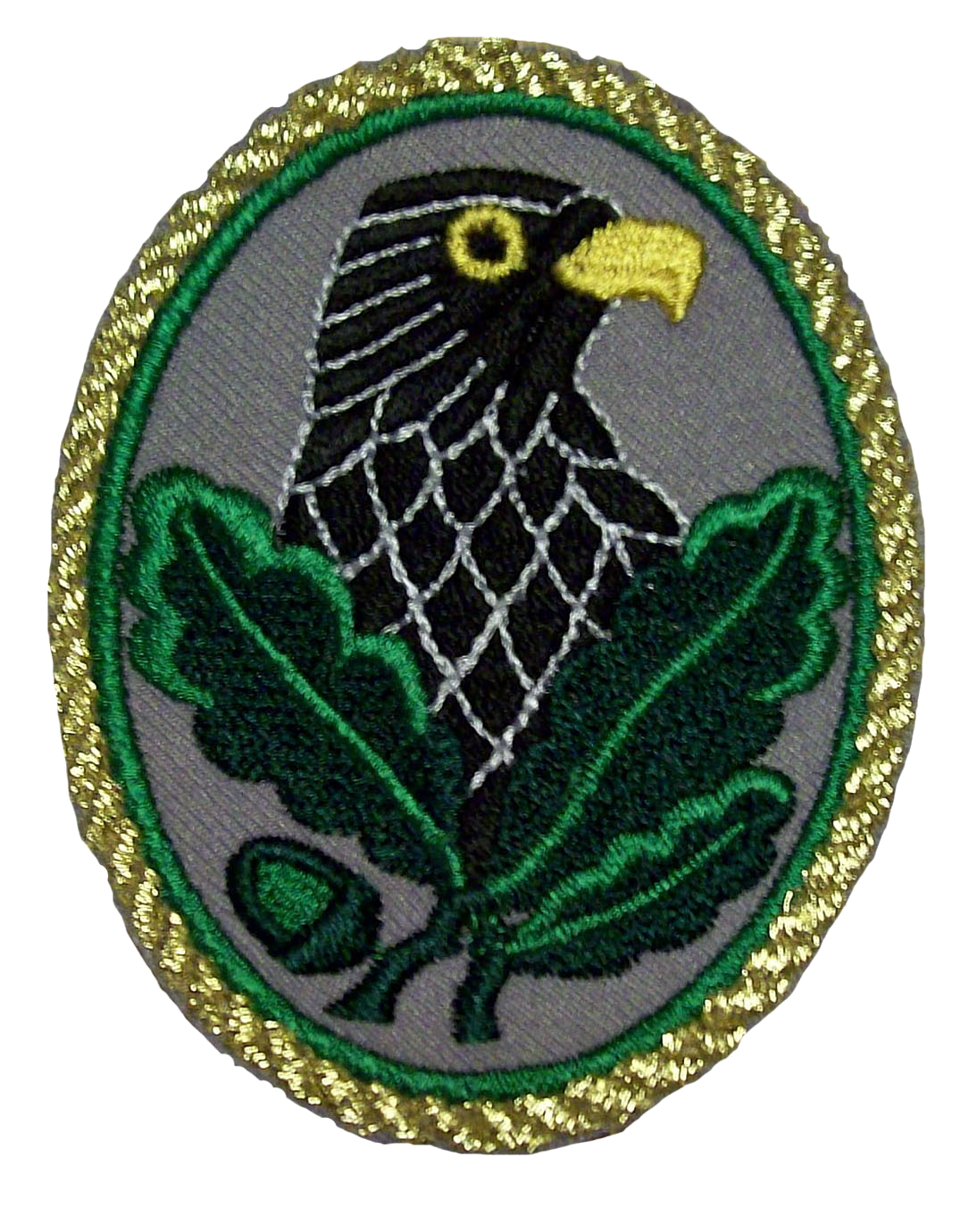
- Sniper's Badge (1st class – gold trim)
- Type: Badge
- Awarded for: successes achieved with a rifle as a sniper
- Description: Cloth
- Presented by: Nazi Germany
- Eligibility: Military personnel
- Campaign: World War II
- Status: Obsolete
- Established: 20 August 1944

The Sniper's Badge (German: Scharfschützenabzeichen) was a World War II German military decoration awarded to snipers. It was instituted on 20 August 1944. Initially, only personnel serving in the German Army and the Waffen-SS were eligible. Later, by order of the High Command, it was also made available to snipers of the other armed services.

The sniper's badge had three grades:

- Third class (no cord) for 20 enemy kills
- Second class (with silver cord) for 40 enemy kills
- First class (with gold cord) for 60 enemy kills

The enemy kills were counted from 1 September 1944. Close quarter kills made were not to be taken into account. Every enemy kill had to be confirmed by witnesses and reported to the unit.

== Description ==
The Sniper's Badge was made of greenish-gray cloth, embroidered and oval shaped. It depicts a black eagle's head turned to its left with white plumage, ochre yellow-colored eyes and closed beak. The eagle's body is covered by three oak leaves and a left mounted acorn. The edges of the ribbon are sewn and the three stages are distinguished by a circumferentially sewn cord in silver (2nd class) or gold (1st class). The badge was worn on the right sleeve of the uniform.

== Particularities ==
At the beginning of 1945, the Oberkommando der Wehrmacht issued the order that the Sniper's Badge had to be removed before being captured, after primarily Soviet troops shot every captured sniper immediately.

Nazi era decorations were banned after the war. The Sniper's Badge was among those re-authorised for wear by the Federal Republic of Germany in 1957, with qualifying members of the Bundeswehr wearing the award on the ribbon bar, represented by a small replica of the badge on a field grey ribbon.

== Recipients ==
- Matthäus Hetzenauer (Gold)
- Bruno Sutkus (Gold)
