= Killings of Raju Pargai and Amit Arya =

2011 police killings in Uttarakhand, India

On September 5, 2011, Raju Pargai and Amit Arya were killed at the Nepal border of Uttarakhand. The Uttarakhand police arrested Lucky Bisht in connection with the killings, who was later released by the court.

== Victims ==
Pargai and Arya had a history of criminal involvement, including murder, kidnapping, and extortion. They had been imprisoned multiple times in connection with various murder cases. Intelligence reports suggested their involvement in the illegal arms trade, playing a significant role in facilitating transportation of weapons from Nepal into India.

== Aftermath ==
Following his arrest, Bisht spent over four years in jail, during which he was transferred to 11 different jails. Bisht was eventually released by the court, on the grounds of insufficient evidence.

== See also ==
- Research and Analysis Wing
