= R.A.W. Hitman: The Real Story of Agent Lima =

Book by Hussain Zaidi

- First edition
- Author: Hussain Zaidi
- Language: English
- Genre: Narrative, true crime
- Publisher: Simon & Schuster
- Publication date: 2023
- Publication place: India, United States
- Media type: Print (paperback, hardback)
- Pages: 304
- ISBN: 9789392099649

R.A.W. Hitman: The Real Story of Agent Lima is a 2023 Indian non-fiction crime novel written by journalist & author Hussain Zaidi. becomes the best seller book in just 3 weeks, It retraces the real life story of former Research and Analysis Wing agent Lucky Bisht also known by his Pseudonym Agent Lima. It is published by Simon & Schuster on July 4, 2023. R.A.W. Hitman is the second book published by Simon & Schuster in India. The book has a foreword by former Commissioner of Delhi Police, Neeraj Kumar.

Although some Indian media, such as India.com (owned by the Zee Media Corporation) have described the book as a biography, the book's author Hussain Zaidi told The Telegraph that "I wouldn't call it a biography because the book focuses on one aspect of his life and we have not touched his personal life or his early life."

The book was described as a "fiery tale" by the Hindustan Times.

Many prominent Indian filmmakers and actors including Vishal Bhardwaj, Anees Bazmee, Jacqueline Fernandez, etc. admired and promoted this book.

This book was described as the best crime book by Mint (newspaper).

A sequel, R.A.W Hitman 2: The Assassinations, was published in 2024.
