= Mikhail Surkov =

Soviet sniper

Mikhail Ilyich Surkov
- Born: Bol'shay Salyr' 1921
- Died: 1953 (age 31-32)
- Allegiance: Soviet Union
- Branch: Infantry
- Service years: 1941–1946
- Rank: Starshina
- Conflicts: World War II
- Awards: Order of Lenin; Order of the Red Star; Medal "For Courage"

Mikhail Ilyich Surkov (Russian: Михаил Ильич Сурков; 1921 – 1953) was a Soviet sniper in the 4th Rifle Division of the Red Army during World War II. He was born in a Siberian town of Bol'shay Salyr' next to Krasnoyarsk and hailed from a family of hunters and fur-trappers.

According to some Soviet newspapers, Surkov had 702 confirmed kills during World War II, a total which would make him the most effective sniper of the European conflict. The top Soviet sniper is officially Ivan Sidorenko, who is credited with 500 confirmed kills, as postwar findings have shown that Surkov's figure very likely only served as propaganda.
