= Matthäus Hetzenauer =

Austrian sniper in the Wehrmacht during WW2

- Born: 23 December 1924; Brixen im Thale, Austria
- Died: 3 October 2004 (aged 79); Brixen im Thale, Austria
- Military career
- Allegiance: Nazi Germany
- Branch: Heer
- Service years: 1943–1945
- Rank: Gefreiter
- Unit: 3rd Mountain Division
- Conflicts: World War II; Eastern Front
- Awards: Knight's Cross of the Iron Cross

Matthäus Hetzenauer (German pronunciation: [maˈtɛːʊs ˈhɛtsənaʊ̯ɐ], 23 December 1924 – 3 October 2004) was an Austrian sniper in the Wehrmacht of Nazi Germany during World War II. He served in the 3rd Gebirgsjäger Division on the Eastern Front of World War II. With 345 confirmed kills, he was the most successful German sniper and one of the deadliest snipers in history. In Nazi Germany, confirmed kills were only valid in the presence of an officer, so Hetzenauer's estimated kills are many times higher. His longest confirmed kill was reported at 1,100 meters (1,200 yards). Hetzenauer received the Knight's Cross of the Iron Cross on 17 April 1945.

== Early life ==
Matthäus Hetzenauer was born on 23 December 1924 in the Austrian Tyrolean village of Brixen im Thale to Simon and Magdalena Hetzenauer, descendants of a long line of Austrian peasantry in the Kitzbühel region. He was baptized as a Catholic on Christmas Eve in the medieval parish church and was raised with his two brothers and sister on his parents' farm above the village. (Note: Today, the Hetzenauer family's farm house, the Sonnleithof, is a hotel.)

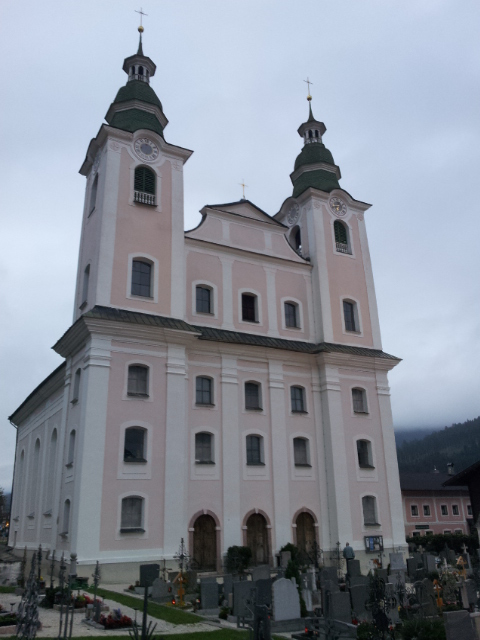
Brixen im Thale's parish deanery, where Hetzenauer spent much of his youth.

== Military career ==
Hetzenauer trained as a sniper from March to July 1944 at the Truppenübungsplatz Seetaler-Alpe in Steiermark, before being assigned as a Gefreiter to the 3rd Gebirgsjäger Division. He utilized both a Karabiner 98k sniper variant with 6× telescopic sight and a Gewehr 43 with ZF4 4× telescopic sight. He saw action against Soviet forces in the Carpathians, Hungary, and Slovakia.

On 6 November 1944, he suffered head trauma from artillery fire and was awarded the Wound Badge three days later.

Gefreiter Hetzenauer received the Knight's Cross of the Iron Cross on 17 April 1945. Generalleutnant and division commander Paul Klatt had recommended Hetzenauer because of his numerous sniper kills, which totalled two enemy companies, without fear for his own safety under artillery fire and enemy attacks. This recommendation was approved by General der Gebirgstruppe Karl von Le Suire and General der Panzertruppe Walter Nehring.

Hetzenauer was captured by Soviet troops the following month, and served five years in a Soviet prison camp.

He died on 3 October 2004. His wife Maria died in 2006.

== Awards ==
- Iron Cross (1939) 2nd Class (1 September 1944) & 1st Class (25 November 1944)
- Wound Badge (1939) in Black (9 November 1944)
- Infantry Assault Badge in Silver (13 November 1944)
- Sniper's Badge in Gold (3 December 1944; one of three recipients)
- Knight's Cross of the Iron Cross on 17 April 1945 as Gefreiter and sniper in the 7./Gebirgsjäger-Regiment 144
