= Beautiful Assassin =

2010 novel by Michael White

- Author: Michael C. White
- Language: English
- Genre: Historical Fiction
- Publisher: William Morrow
- Publication date: 3/30/2010
- Publication place: United States
- Media type: Print (hardcover)
- Pages: 464
- ISBN: 978-0-06-169121-8

Beautiful Assassin is a historical fiction novel by Michael C. White. The book is set during World War II and focuses on the fictional Lieutenant Tat'yana Levchenko, whose husband goes missing and daughter is killed, inspiring her to become a soldier. After becoming a Soviet hero for killing over 300 Germans, she is wounded in battle and while recovering is asked to come to the United States at the request of First Lady Eleanor Roosevelt to promote the war effort.

== Plot ==
The novel centers on Lieutenant Tat'yana Levchenko, who decides to join the Soviet Army as a sniper after her husband, Nikolai Grigorovich (who is known as Koyla by "those few friends he had") goes missing in action and her daughter, Masha, is killed by Germans in their hometown of Kiev, Ukraine. After Masha's death, Tat'yana desires to become a soldier and boards a train filled with recruits. As she and the recruits change into military gear and uniforms on the train, while some make lewd comments at her, Tat'yana is one of the first to acknowledge that she can fire a gun when asked by a political officer. After killing a cow in a farmer's field, the officer smiles and tells her to "Do the same with the Germans" (page 248). During the Siege of Sevastopol, Tat'yana becomes a Soviet hero when she kills a confirmed 300 Germans, including one called the "King of Death." After being wounded in action (which requires a hysterectomy), Tat'yana is evacuated from the front and while recovering from her injuries is presented with the Gold Star medal, is honored a Hero of the Soviet Union, and receives many letters thank her for her service and bravery.

Tat'yana's fame grows to the point that Eleanor Roosevelt, First Lady of the United States, hears of her actions and invites her to America. While in America, Tat'yana becomes friends with Roosevelt, along with her interpreter Captain Jack Taylor (real name Charles Pierce), and becomes an unwilling pawn in the efforts of her handler Vasilyev, who wants Tat'yana to get close to the first lady in the hopes of uncovering President Franklin D. Roosevelt's war intentions. Forced to question the motives of her handler and even her translator and must make the decision of whether to remain in the United States or return to the Soviet Union, she then mysteriously disappears.

In the book's epilogue, many decades after her disappearance, an elderly Tat'yana is found by a journalist who revealed her story of her wanting to marry Captain Taylor (who died in a plane crash before the end of the war), learning from him about a Soviet spy network in the United States, a letter from Mrs. Roosevelt after President Roosevelt's death, a photo of Tat'yana and her family, and the log she recorded her kills in. The novel ends with the journalist, whose name is Elizabeth, revealing that she and her husband adopted a Russian girl named Raisa, who Tat'yana remembered rescuing from the Germans in the sewers of Sevastopol during her time as a sniper, but had no knowledge of what happened to her after the war.

== Characters ==
Lieutenant Tat'yana Levchenko: Russian sniper who becomes famous for killing a confirmed 300 Germans (often exaggerated for publicity) at the Battle of Sevastopol

Nikolai (Koyla) and Masha: Tat'yana's husband and daughter. Koyla is serving country when he goes missing and is presumed dead, but later is revealed to be recovering in a hospital. Masha was killed in front of her mother, leading Tat'yana to want to take a direct role in the war against Germany.

Vasilyev: Tat'yana's handler during her tour of the United States

Captain Jack Taylor (real name Charles Pierce): Tat'yana's interpreter, who she later falls in love with and decides to defect to the United States

Eleanor Roosevelt: First Lady of the United States from 1933 to 1945

Raisa: Girl rescued during the Battle of Sevastopol and later adopted by the reporter Elizabeth

Elizabeth: Journalist who interviews an elderly Tat'yana at the end of the novel

== Development history ==
The protagonist, Lieutenant Tat'yana Levchenko, was inspired by the historical accomplishments of Lyudmila Pavlichenko.

== Publication history ==
2010, USA, William Morrow, ISBN 978-0-06-169121-8 Pub date 30 March 2010, Hardcover
2011, USA, Harper Perennial, ISBN 978-0-06-169122-5 Pub date 22 March 2011, Paperback

== Awards ==
- Won the 2011 Connecticut Book Awards for Fiction
