= Fedir Dyachenko =

Soviet sniper (1917–1995)

Fedir Trofymovych Dyachenko
- Федір Трохимович Дяченко
- Born: 16 June [O.S. 3 June] 1917; Betyagi, Poltava Governorate, Russian Empire
- Died: 8 August 1995 (aged 78); St. Petersburg, Russia
- Military career
- Allegiance: Soviet Union
- Branch: Red Army
- Service years: 1941–1962
- Rank: Major
- Conflicts: World War II; Eastern Front
- Awards: Hero of the Soviet Union

Fedir Trokhymovych Dyachenko (Ukrainian: Федір Трохимович Дяченко; Russian: Фёдор Трофимович Дьяченко, romanized: Fyodor Trofimovich Dyachenko; 16 June [O.S. 3 June] 1917 – 8 August 1995) was a Soviet sniper who became one of the top snipers in World War II. He was awarded the title Hero of the Soviet Union on 21 February 1944 for killing 425 enemy soldiers and officers. He is considered as one of the deadliest snipers in history.

== Early life ==
Dyachenko was born on 16 June [O.S. 3 June] 1917 in Betyagi village to a Ukrainian peasant family. After completing his ninth grade of school in 1934 he worked on a collective farm. After being convicted of a crime in 1939 he was sentenced to prison in Norilsk, where he worked as a plasterer on construction sites until he was released and drafted into the Red Army.

== World War II ==
On 7 January 1942 he was drafted into the Red Army. During training he showed good sharpshooting skills. After training he was sent to the Leningrad Front. According to his own memoirs, he decided to become a sniper in summer 1942 after reading in a frontline newspaper about the feats of snipers on the Leningrad Front. After he completed formal sniper training at the sniper school of the 55th Army, he was assigned as a sniper to the 187th Rifle Regiment of the 72nd Rifle Division. On 16 September he opened his combat account, and he became successful in hunting other snipers. During the course of a ten-day sniper hunt he killed 32 enemy soldiers. On 24 October he scored nine kills without any misses. He received his first award, the Order of the Red Star, on 21 December 1942, for killing 97 enemies. He went on a special sniper hunt with his friend Nikolai Kochubey on 25 December 1942; Kochubey killed seven enemies in the hunt, while Dyachenko killed eleven. By then, Dyachenko had killed 220 enemies, and on 10 March 1943, he brought up his kill count to 300. An article in the frontline newspaper Na Strazhe Rodiny published on the cover of the 27 May 1943 issue celebrated his 400th kill. For killing 425 enemy soldiers and officers he was awarded the title Hero of the Soviet Union on 21 February 1944. Despite being a Soviet soldier, he was also awarded the American Distinguished Service Cross. However, his sniper career was brought to an end in January 1944, when he was badly wounded by a shell fragment.

== Later life ==
Despite being wounded and withdrawn from the front, he was not demobilized after the war. He graduated from military-political courses in 1946 and from the Military-Political School in 1949. He became the party organizer of a battalion at the Leningrad Military School of Communications. In 1962 he left the army with the rank of Major. For the rest of his life he lived in Leningrad, working as a senior engineer at the Kirov Plant. He died on 8 August 1995 and is buried in the Kovalyovskoye cemetery.

== Awards ==
- Hero of the Soviet Union (21 February 1944)
- Order of Lenin (21 February 1944)
- Order of the Patriotic War 1st class (11 March 1985)
- Order of the Red Star (21 December 1942)
- Medal "For Battle Merit" (13 June 1952)
- Distinguished Service Cross (13 July 1944)

== Literature ==
- Khrenov, I (27 May 1943). "На счету - 400". На страже Родины : газета Ленинградского военного округа (in Russian). p. 1.
- Dyachenko, F. (25 April 1945). "Победа близка". На страже Родины : газета Ленинградского военного округа (in Russian). p. 4.
- Walter, John (2019). The Sniper Encyclopaedia: An A-Z Guide to World Sniping. Casemate Publishers. ISBN 978-1-78438-242-1.
- The History of Sniping and Sharpshooting by Major John L Plaster, USAR
