= R.A.W Hitman 2: The Assassinations =

Book by Hussain Zaidi

R.A.W Hitman 2: The Assassination
- second edition
- Author: Lucky Bisht
- Language: English
- Genre: Narrative, nonfiction
- Publisher: Simon & Schuster
- Publication date: 3 December 2024
- Publication place: India, United States
- Media type: Print (paperback, hardback)
- Pages: 256
- ISBN: 9788197949203

R.A.W Hitman 2: The Assassination is a non-fiction novel by former R&AW agent Lucky Bisht, created by author S. Hussain Zaidi. Published by Simon & Schuster on December 3, 2024, it is the sequel to R.A.W. Hitman: The Real Story of Agent Lima.

The book’s launch was attended by author Vikram Chandra, Bollywood actor Jimmy Shergill, and directors Abbas-Mustan. & Soumya Pandey.
