= Yula =

Mayan archaeological site in the Yucatán Peninsula

Yula is an archaeological site of the Maya civilization of pre-Columbian Mesoamerica, located in northern center of the Yucatán Peninsula, in the vicinity of the major Postclassic Maya center of Chichen Itza.
