= Sirijap =

Landform in India and China

- Alluvial plain
- Coordinates: 33.74°N 78.849°E
- Elevation: 4,300 m (14,100 ft)

Sirijap is an alluvial plain on the northern bank of lake Pangong Tso, which plays a role in the Sino-Indian border dispute in the Ladakh region.

India had established three posts in Sirijap between April 1960 and October 1962, prior to the Sino-Indian War. Chinese forces defeated these posts on 21 October 1962 after encountering fierce resistance.

After the war, a Line of Actual Control (LAC) was established which, in India's view, runs to the left of the Sirijap plain at a shore point called "Finger 8". China claims the LAC to be further west at "Finger 4". The area between the two fingers continues to be patrolled by the Indian border police.

In May 2013, it was reported that China had constructed a metal-top road in the area leading up to Finger 4. The Indian army claims to have used the road to patrol the area.

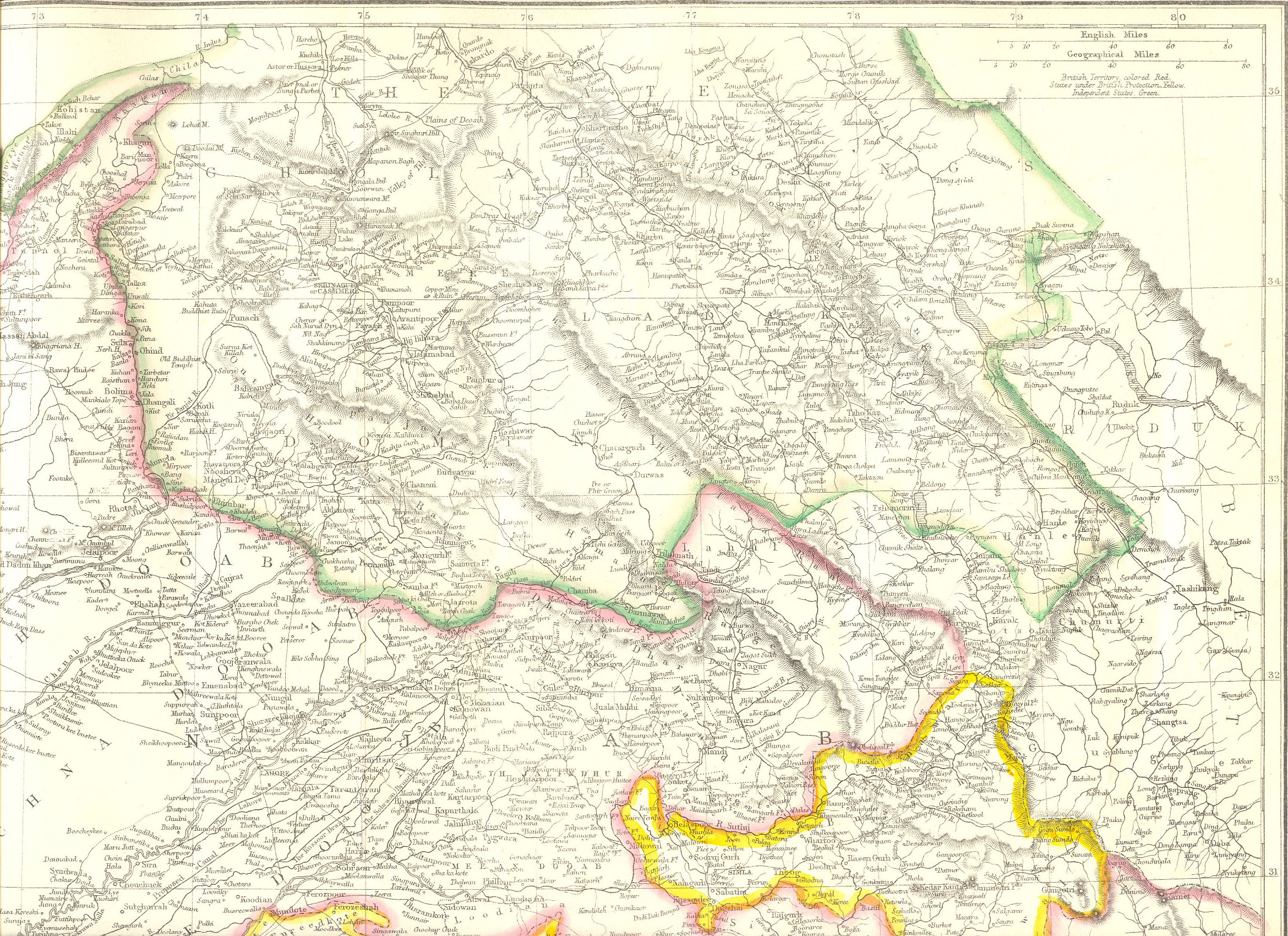
Edward Weller map of Ladakh and Garhwal, 1863

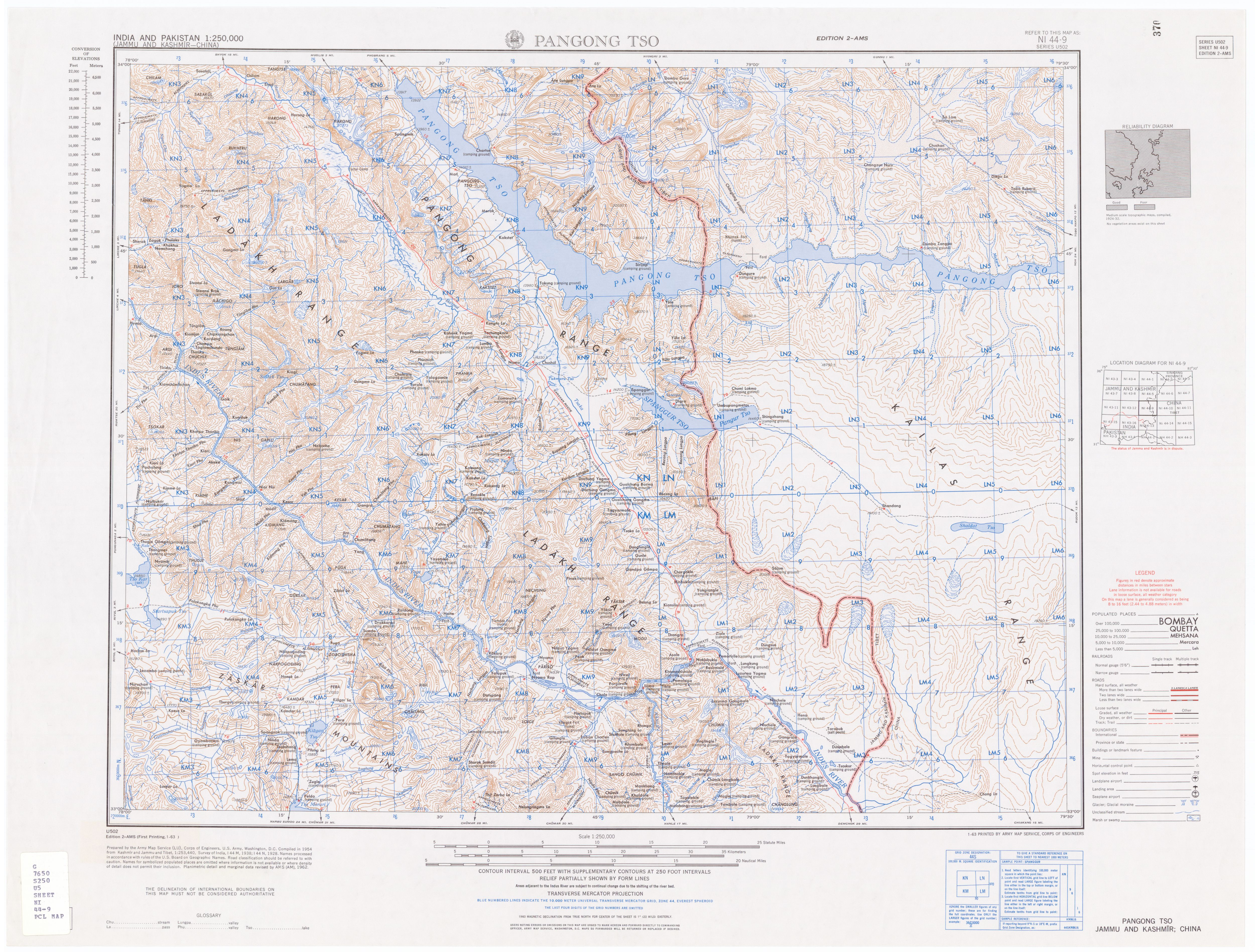
Map including Spanggur Tso / Pangur Tso (AMS, 1954) (Note: From map: "THE DELINEATION OF INTERNATIONAL BOUNDARIES ON THIS MAP MUST NOT BE CONSIDERED AUTHORITATIVE")

Map including Spanggur Tso (DMA, 1982)

== See also ==
- List of locations in Aksai Chin
