= Kuka, Russia =

Kuka (Russian: Кука) is the name of two rural localities in Chitinsky District of Zabaykalsky Krai, Russia:

- Kuka (selo), a selo
- Kuka (settlement at the station), a rural locality classified as a settlement at the station
