= Lyudmila Pavlichenko =

Soviet sniper (1916–1974)

- Людмила Павличенко
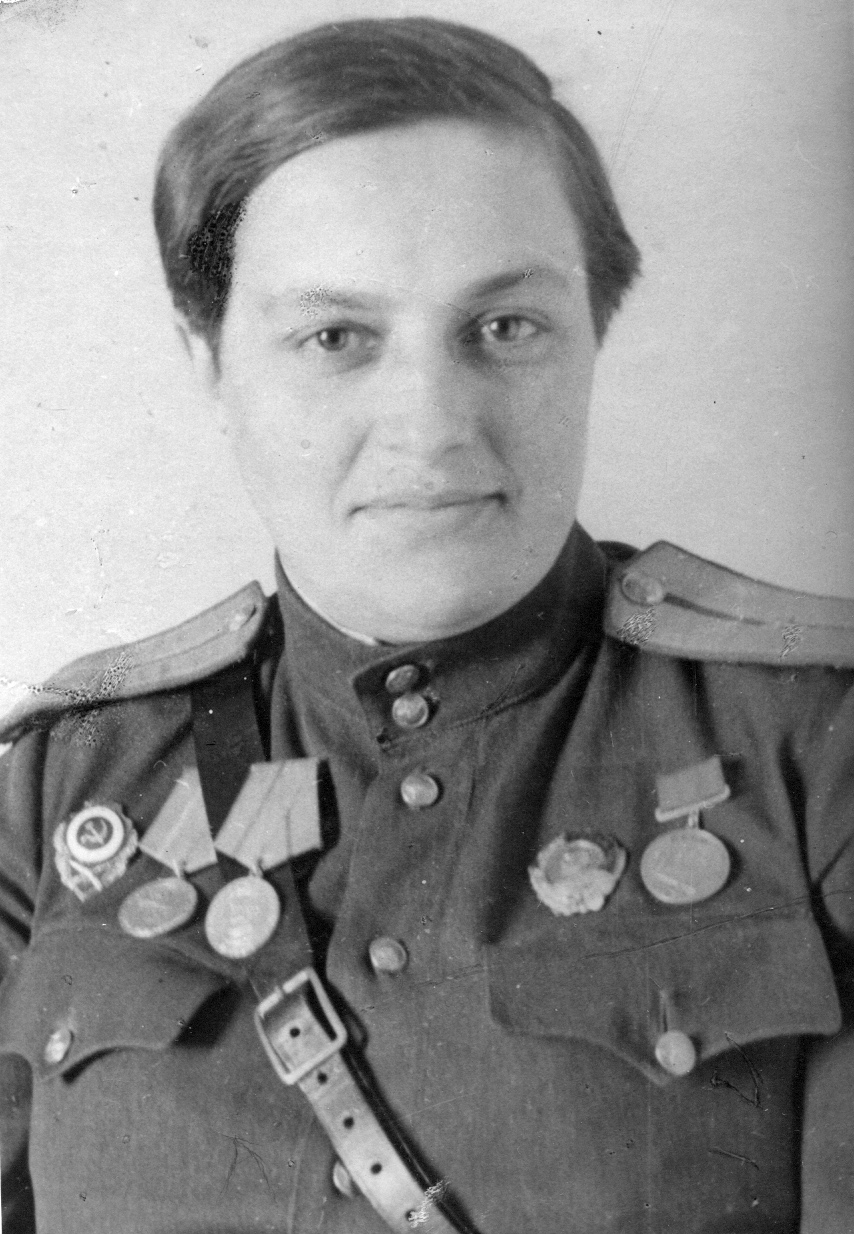
- Pavlichenko in 1943
- Born: Lyudmila Mikhailovna Belova; 12 July 1916; Belaya Tserkov, Russian Empire
- Died: 10 October 1974 (aged 58); Moscow, Soviet Union
- Burial place: Novodevichy Cemetery
- Spouses: Alexei Pavlichenko (m. 1932, divorced) Alexei Kitsenko (m. 1941; died 1942)
- Children: Rostislav Pavlichenko
- Military career
- Allegiance: Soviet Union
- Branch: Red Army
- Service years: 1941–1953
- Rank: Lieutenant in the Army; Senior Researcher (Major) in the Soviet Navy
- Nickname: Lady Death
- Units: 25th Rifle Division; 54th Stenka Razin Rifle Regiment; Soviet Navy General Staff
- Conflicts: World War II; Siege of Odessa; Siege of Sevastopol
- Awards: Hero of the Soviet Union; Order of Lenin (2)
- Other work: Soviet Committee of the Veterans of War

Lyudmila Mikhailovna Pavlichenko (Note: In this name that follows East Slavic naming customs, the patronymic is Mikhailovna and the family name is Pavlichenko.) (Note: Russian: Людмила Михайловна Павличенко, romanized: Lyudmila Mikhailovna Pavlichenko; Ukrainian: Людмила Михайлівна Павличенко, romanized: Lyudmyla Mykhailivna Pavlychenko) (née Belova; 12 July [O.S. 29 June] 1916 – 10 October 1974) was a Soviet sniper in the Red Army during World War II. She is the deadliest female sniper, and one of the deadliest snipers in history, with 309 confirmed kills. She served in the Red Army during the siege of Odessa and the siege of Sevastopol, during the early stages of the fighting on the Eastern Front.

After she was injured in battle by a mortar shell, she was evacuated to Moscow. After she recovered from her injuries, she trained other Red Army snipers and was a public spokeswoman for the Red Army. In 1942, she toured the United States, Canada, and the United Kingdom. After the war ended in 1945, she was reassigned as a senior researcher for the Soviet Navy. She died of a stroke at the age of 58.

== Early life and education ==
Lyudmila Belova was born in Belaya Tserkov, Kiev Governorate, in the Russian Empire (present-day Bila Tserkva Ukraine) on 12 July [O.S. 29 June] 1916, to Mikhail Belov, a locksmith from Petrograd, and his wife Elena Trofimovna Belova (1897–1972), who was of Russian nobility. The family moved to Kiev when Lyudmila was aged 14. Her father was a Communist Party member, and had served as a regimental commissar in the Red Army, being awarded the Order of the Red Banner.

As a child, Lyudmila was a self-described tomboy, who was fiercely competitive at athletic activities. In Kiev, she joined an OSOAVIAKhIM shooting club, developed into an amateur sharpshooter and earned her Voroshilov Sharpshooter badge and a marksman certificate.

In 1932, she married Alexei Pavlichenko, and gave birth to a son, Rostislav (1932–2007). However, the marriage was soon dissolved, and Lyudmila returned to live with her parents. She attended night school as well as performing household chores. During the day, she worked as a grinder at the Kiev Arsenal factory.

She enrolled at Kiev University in 1937, where she studied history and intended to be a scholar and teacher. There, she competed on the university's track team as a sprinter and pole vaulter. She was also enrolled in a military-style sniping school for six months by the Red Army.

== World War II ==
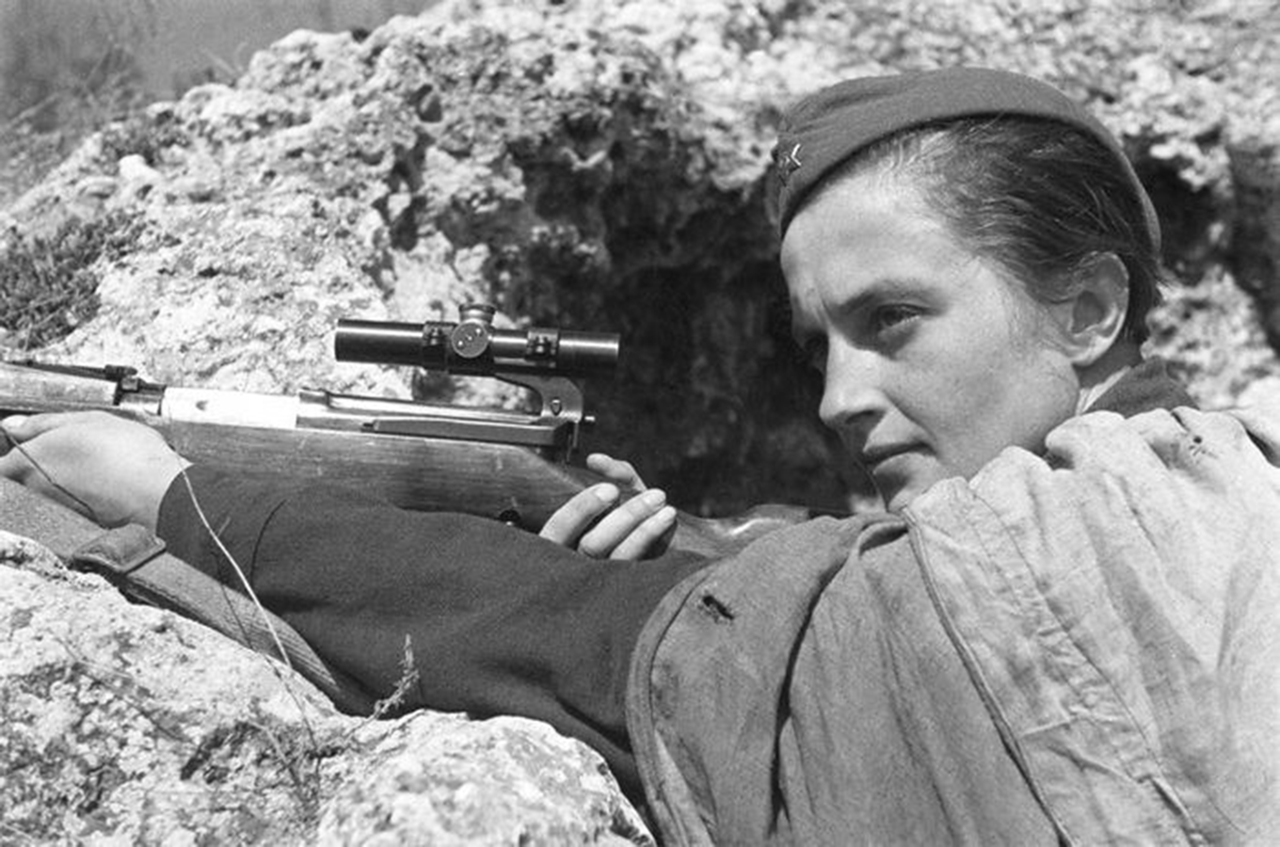
Pavlichenko in a trench (1942).

In June 1941, Pavlichenko was aged 25 in her fourth year studying history at Kiev University when Nazi Germany began its invasion of the Soviet Union. Pavlichenko was among the first round of volunteers at the Odessa recruiting office, where she requested to join the infantry.

The registrar pushed Pavlichenko to be a nurse, but she refused. After seeing that she had completed multiple training courses, she was finally accepted into the army as a sniper and assigned to the Red Army's 25th Rifle Division. There, she became one of 2,000 female snipers in the Red Army, of whom about 500 survived the war. She was initially assigned to digging trenches and communication routes, armed with a single RGD-33 grenade due to weapons shortages. In the second half of July 1941, a comrade was severely injured by shrapnel and handed her his Mosin–Nagant model 1891 bolt-action rifle. On 8 August 1941 Lyudmila experienced her debut as a wartime sniper when she killed two German officers in Biliaivka at a distance of 400 metres.

Pavlichenko fought for about 2 1/2 months during the Siege of Odessa and is credited with killing 187 soldiers. She was promoted to senior sergeant in August 1941, when she added 100 more kills to her official tally. At 25, she married a fellow sniper, Alexei Kitsenko. Soon after the marriage, Kitsenko was mortally wounded by a mortar shell and died from his injuries a few days later in the hospital.

When the Nazis and their Romanian allies overran Odessa on 15 October 1941, her unit was withdrawn by sea to Sevastopol, on the Crimean Peninsula, to fight in the siege of Sevastopol. There, she trained other snipers, who were credited with killing over 100 Axis soldiers during the battle. In May 1942, newly promoted Lieutenant Pavlichenko was cited by the Southern Army Council for killing 257 Axis soldiers. The number of soldiers Pavlichenko is credited with killing during World War II was 309, including 36 Axis snipers.

In June 1942, Pavlichenko was hit in the face with shrapnel from a mortar shell. When she was injured, the Soviet High Command ordered for her to be evacuated from Sevastopol via submarine.

She spent around a month in the hospital. Once she had recovered from her injuries, instead of being sent back to the front, she became a propagandist for the Red Army, where she was nicknamed "Lady Death." (The Germans called her "the Russian bitch from hell.") She also trained snipers for combat duty until the end of the war in 1945.

== Visits to Allied countries ==
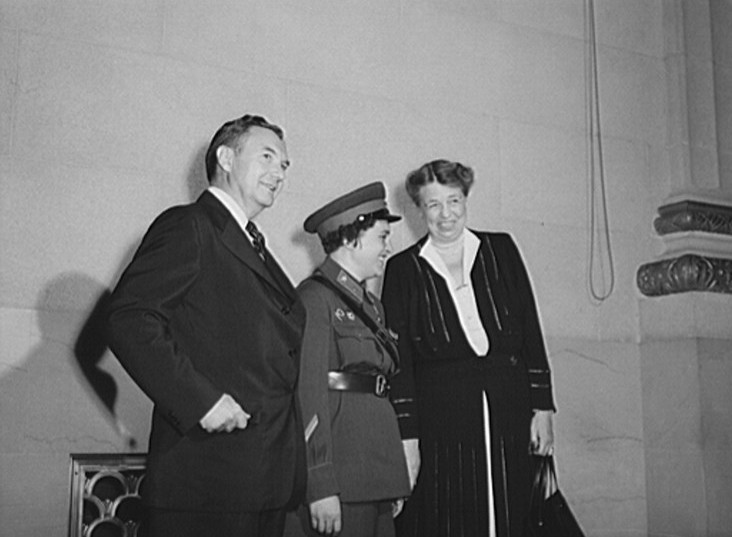
Pavlichenko (center) with Justice Robert Jackson (left) and US First Lady Eleanor Roosevelt in Washington DC in September 1942.

In 1942, Pavlichenko was sent to Canada and the United States for a publicity visit as part of the Soviet Union's attempts to convince the other Allies of World War II to open a second front against Nazi Germany. When she visited the United States, she became the first Soviet citizen to be received by a US president, as Franklin D. Roosevelt welcomed her to the White House. Pavlichenko was later invited by First Lady Eleanor Roosevelt to tour the US, relating her experiences as a female soldier on the front lines.

During the publicity tour, Pavlichenko was not taken seriously by the press and was referred to as the "Girl Sniper." Not cut out to be a diplomat, she was shy and said she just wanted to kill fascists. When meeting with reporters in Washington, D.C., she was dumbfounded by the kind of questions put to her. "One reporter even criticized the length of the skirt of my uniform, saying that in America women wear shorter skirts and besides my uniform made me look fat." They also asked if she used makeup on the front line. She challenged an especially sexist reporter to a fistfight. She responded to a question about her underwear so:

"I am proud to wear the uniform of the legendary Red Army. It has been sanctified by the blood of my comrades who've fallen in combat with the fascists."

She was described by the reporters as very blunt and unemotional in her responses.

Pavlichenko appeared before the International Student Assembly being held in Washington, DC, attended the meetings of the Congress of Industrial Organizations, and made appearances and speeches in New York City and Chicago. In New York City, she was given a raccoon fur coat by Mayor Fiorello H. La Guardia. In Chicago, she stood before large crowds, chiding the men to support a second front. "Gentlemen," she said, "I am 25 years old and I have killed 309 fascist invaders by now. Don't you think, gentlemen, that you have been hiding behind my back for too long?" Her words settled on the crowd, then caused a surging roar of support. The United States government presented her with a Colt semi-automatic pistol.

In Toronto, Ontario, she was presented a Winchester Model 70 rifle equipped with a Weaver telescopic sight, now on display at the Central Armed Forces Museum in Moscow. While visiting Canada, along with fellow sniper Vladimir Pchelintsev and Moscow fuel commissioner Nikolai Kravchenko, she was greeted by thousands of people at Toronto's Union Station.

On Friday 21 November 1942, Pavlichenko visited Coventry, England, accepting donations of £4,516 from local workers to pay for three X-ray units for the Red Army. She also visited the ruins of Coventry Cathedral, then the Alfred Herbert works and Standard Motor Factory, from where most funds had been raised. She had inspected a factory in Birmingham earlier in the day.

Having been made an officer, Pavlichenko never returned to combat, instead becoming an instructor and training snipers until the war's end. In 1943, she was awarded the Gold Star of the Hero of the Soviet Union, as well as the Order of Lenin twice.

== Later life ==
When the war ended, Pavlichenko finished her education at Kiev University and began a career as a historian. From 1945 to 1953, she was a research assistant at Soviet Navy headquarters. She was later active in the Soviet Committee of the Veterans of War.

== Death and legacy ==
Pavlichenko died from a stroke on 10 October 1974 at 58 and was buried in Novodevichy Cemetery in Moscow. Her son, Rostislav, is buried next to her.

A second Soviet commemorative stamp featuring her portrait was issued in 1976.

== In popular culture ==
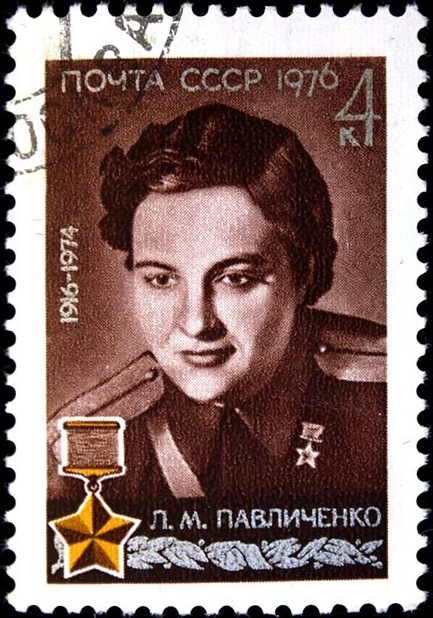
Second Soviet Union-issued postage stamp dedicated to Pavlichenko

The American folk singer Woody Guthrie composed the song "Miss Pavlichenko" as a tribute to her war record and to memorialize her visits to the United States and Canada. It was released as part of The Asch Recordings.

Pavlichenko is the subject of the 2015 film Battle for Sevastopol (original Russian title, "Битва за Севастополь"). A joint Ukrainian-Russian production, it was released in both countries on 2 April 2015, and its international premiere took place two weeks later at the Beijing International Film Festival.

The first English language edition of her memoirs, Lady Death, was published by Greenhill Books in February 2018. It has a foreword by Martin Pegler and is part of the Lionel Leventhal's Greenhill Sniper Library series.

In the 2021 game Call of Duty: Vanguard, there is a character based loosely off of Pavlichenko named Polina Petrova.

Pavlichenko's experiences during World War II, both in battle and on tour in the United States, have inspired several historical fiction novels, including Beautiful Assassin (2010) and Kate Quinn's 2022 novel The Diamond Eye.

Additionally, she was featured in the Japanese manga series, The War of Greedy Witches, where Pavlichenko served as one of the witches to fight against Murasaki Shikibu in Walpurgis.

== Awards and honours ==
- Hero of the Soviet Union (25 October 1943)
- Two Orders of Lenin (16 July 1942 and 25 October 1943)
- Two Medals "For Military Merit" (26 April 1942 and 13 June 1952)
- Medal "For the Defence of Odessa" (1942)
- Medal "For the Defence of Sevastopol" (1942)
- Medal "For the Victory over Germany in the Great Patriotic War 1941–1945" (14 December 1945)
- Voroshilov Sharpshooter badge (1939)

== See also ==
- List of female Heroes of the Soviet Union
- Roza Shanina – World War II female sniper credited with 59 confirmed kills
- Lydia Litvyak – World War II female flying ace
- Snipers of the Soviet Union
- Juba (sniper)
