= Trịnh Tố Tâm =

Vietnamese soldier and politician (1945 – 1996)

Trịnh Tố Tâm (1945–1996) was a Vietnamese soldier and politician from Đồng Tân, Ứng Hòa district, Hanoi. He was a member of the People's Army of Vietnam, Hero of the People's Armed Forces, former Deputy Minister of the Ministry of Labour, Invalids and Social Affairs, former secretary of the Ho Chi Minh Communist Youth Union, and former Head of the Army Youth Department. He was also the first Editor-in-Chief of the Labor and Social Affairs newspaper.

== Military career ==
In 1965, when the United States Army bombed Northern Vietnam, Trịnh Tố Tâm was a student. He volunteered to join the "Three Ready" (3 sẵn sàng) movement. He then wrote an application to join the army, volunteered to fight on the southern battlefield, and was mobilized to the Quảng Trị - Thừa Thiên area.

According to the Communist Party-owned news outlet Báo điện tử Tiền Phong, Trịnh Tố Tâm commanded a unit which fought in 58 battles and killed 1,500 enemy soldiers between 1967 and 1970. It is stated that he personally killed 272 enemy soldiers and shot down three helicopters.

Starting in 1976 after the end of the war, he held positions in the Communist Party of Vietnam and the State of Vietnam. The includes serving as the Deputy Minister of the Ministry of Labor, Invalids and Social Affairs, secretary of the Ho Chi Minh Communist Youth Union, and Head of the Army Youth Department.

He died in 1996 from a malignant disease likely caused by his exposure to chemical toxins during the war.

== Awards ==
With his achievements, on September 20, 1971, Trịnh Tố Tâm was awarded the title of Hero of the People's Armed Forces by the State of Vietnam at the age of 26. He is the person with the most orders and medals in the Vietnam People's Army.

He was awarded by the Party and State of Vietnam several badges and medals, including:

- 1 Order of Independence, third class
- 1 Medal of Resistance, first class
- 13 Feat Orders
- 3 Vietnam Liberation Army Medal, first class
- 53 American Destroyer awards

=== Honors ===
A statue was built in the honor of Trịnh Tố Tâm at Ung Hoa B High School, Ứng Hòa district, Hanoi, and was inaugurated on September 4, 2020. He has two streets named after him; one in Lăng Cô, Phú Lộc district, Thừa Thiên Huế Province, and the other in Bồ Đề, Long Biên district, Hanoi.

== See also ==
- Zhang Taofang (1931–2007), a Chinese sniper credited with killing 214 enemies during the Korean War
