= Ranjith Premasiri Madalana =

Sri Lankan army sniper

Ranjith Premasiri † DPS, PBP
- Born: Ranjith Premasiri Madalana; 1969; Pallama, Sri Lanka
- Died: April 28, 2009 (aged 39–40); Puthumathalan, Sri Lanka
- Military career
- Allegiance: Sri Lanka
- Branch: Sri Lanka Army
- Service years: 1991–2009
- Rank: Corporal
- Nickname: Nero or Niro or Newro
- Units: Sri Lanka Army Volunteer Force; 5th Battalion Gajaba Regiment
- Conflicts: Sri Lankan Civil War: Operation Riviresa; Eelam War IV
- Awards: Desha Putra Sammanaya; Purna Bhumi Padakkama; North and East Operations Medal; Riviresa Campaign Services Medal; Sri Lanka Army 50th Anniversary Medal; 50th Independence Anniversary Commemoration Medal

Ranjith Premasiri Madalana, alias "Nero" was a decorated Sri Lanka Army sniper with 180 confirmed LTTE kills during the Sri Lankan Civil War.

He was killed on 28 April 2009, in Puthumathalan, Mullaitivu Sri Lanka, 20 days before the end of the conflict.

== Military career ==
At the height of the Sri Lankan Civil War, Premasiri joined the Sri Lanka Army Volunteer Force in 1991 at the age of 22. After his training at the Diyathalawa Army base, he was attached to the 5th Battalion of the Gajaba Regiment.

After completing the Sri Lanka Army 8th sniper course, he joined the Army snipers in 2000. He has served in several military offensives including at the Muhamalai and Nagakovil Forward Defense Lines and the Manalkadu area in Jaffna. Newro and his close sniper colleague corporal Nandasiri known as "Catch" were assigned to Muhamalai in 2007. They both later served on military offensives together, including in battles on the A35 Paranthan-Mullativu road, leading up to the final battle at Puthumathalan. He was attached to the 58th Division of the SL Army.

He was injured several times during his service but chose to remain serving in active duty. Newro was injured from LTTE shelling a few weeks prior to his death in early April 2009. He later returned to the frontlines after a few days of medical leave, joining his colleagues in the final battle, showing his bravery and courage. Newro was known for his speed, excellent camouflage skills, and a high level of perseverance, tolerance, and determination.

On 28 April 2009, LTTE combatants took hiding among Tamil civilians that were fleeing to government controlled areas in Puthumathalan. While tracking the combatants, Newro was killed by a headshot from an LTTE sniper, while serving next to his longtime colleague Corporal Nandasiri. Both Nandasiri and another Sri Lanka Army sniper Major Sanjaya Liyanage have spoken about Newro on the Wanesa YouTube TV Channel.

The Sri Lankan Civil war ended on 18 May 2009 just 20 days after Corporal Premasiri's death. At the time of his death, he had served 18 years in the Sri Lanka Army and 9 years of it as a sniper with at least 180 confirmed enemy kills.

== Legacy ==
Known by his nickname Newro, he has been frequently referred to as "Nero" by the public and in mainstream media.

A photograph frequently published by sections of the Sri Lankan media as depicting Premasiri has been disputed by his former colleagues. They have stated that the individual shown—an Army Special Forces soldier carrying a medium machine gun and wearing a black headscarf—is not Ranjith Premasiri.

In 2021, Arimac Lanka Private Limited launched a third person stealth action game called "Nero" focused on him and his family. Throughout the game, the game designers pay a tribute to the Sri Lankan forces, especially Nero. The game which is available on Steam has a PC-based single-player campaign and a mobile-based multiplayer.

== Honors and decorations ==

	Desha Putra Sammanaya	Purna Bhumi Padakkama	
North and East Operations Medal	Riviresa Campaign Services Medal	Sri Lanka Army 50th Anniversary Medal	50th Independence Anniversary Commemoration Medal

== See also ==
- List of snipers
- List of Sri Lankan military personnel
