= Zhang Taofang =

Chinese sniper

Zhang Taofang 張桃芳
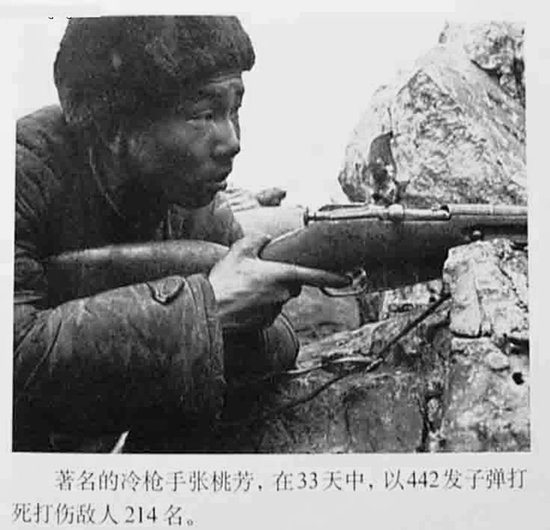
- Zhang Taofang. The caption reads "Well-known guerrilla shooter Zhang Taofang, he killed or wounded 214 with 442 shots within 33 days."
- Born: 29 April 1931; Xinghua, Jiangsu, Republic of China
- Died: 29 October 2007 (aged 76); Weifang, Shandong, China
- Military career
- Allegiance: China
- Branch: People's Volunteer Army; People's Liberation Army Air Force
- Units: 8th Company, 214th Regiment, 24th Corps
- Conflicts: Korean War

Zhang Taofang (Chinese: 張桃芳; pinyin: Zhāng Táo Fāng; Wade–Giles: Zhang Tao-fang, 29 April 1931 - 29 October 2007) was a Chinese sniper. He is credited with killing or wounding 214 in 32 days during the Korean War.

== Korean War ==
Zhang deployed to Triangle Hill with the 8th company, 214th Regiment, 24th Corps on 11 January 1953; he had been part of the army for less than two years. He was armed with an old Mosin–Nagant M44 without a PU scope.

18 days later Zhang spotted a target. He immediately aimed, fired, and missed 12 times, and was nearly killed by counter-fire. Based on that experience, Zhang refined his aiming technique with the iron sight, and the next time he fired, he hit the target. On February 15, he hit 7 targets with 9 rounds, a ratio surpassing many experienced snipers.

According to a publicity photograph, Zhang reportedly killed or wounded 214 in 32 days, winning him a first class merit.

== Post war ==
After the end of the Korean War in 1954, Zhang was transferred to the People's Liberation Army Air Force (PLAAF), and was sent to study at the PLAAF aviation schools in Xuzhou and Jinan. In 1956, he joined the Chinese Communist Party and worked as a fighter pilot at the Air Force Training Base in Gaomi, where he flew MiG-15 and MiG-15bis trainers. Under the instructions of PLAAF commander Liu Yalou, Zhang was appointed as the battalion commander of an air defense force. Later, he served as deputy instructor of the guard company of an air base, student at the Shanghai Air Force Political School, instructor of the guard company of Weixian Air Base in Shandong and deputy chief of staff of the Ninth Surface-to-Air Missile Regiment Command. He retired from military service in 1985. Zhang died on 29 October 2007.

== Popular culture ==
The 2022 film Sniper is a fictionalized account of the experiences of Zhang Taofang during the Korean War. It was funded by the China Film Administration.

== Awards ==
- China:
  - Combat Hero (Second class)
- North Korea:
  - Order of the National Flag (First class)

== See also ==
- Trịnh Tố Tâm (1945–1996), a North Vietnamese soldier stated to have personally killed 272 enemies during the Vietnam War
