= Ivan Sidorenko =

Soviet sniper

Ivan Mikhailovich Sidorenko
- Born: 12 September 1919; Glinkovsky District, Smolensk Oblast, Soviet Russia
- Died: 19 February 1994 (aged 74); Kizlyar, Republic of Dagestan, Russia
- Military career
- Allegiance: Soviet Union
- Branch: Infantry
- Service years: 1939–1945
- Rank: Major
- Unit: 1122 RR/ 334 RD/ 4 SA/ 1 BF
- Conflicts: World War II
- Awards: Hero of the Soviet Union; Order of Lenin; Order of the Red Banner; Order of the Red Star; Medal "For Courage"; Medal "For the Victory over Germany in the Great Patriotic War 1941–1945"

Ivan Mikhailovich Sidorenko (Russian: Ива́н Миха́йлович Сидоре́нко; 12 September 1919 – 19 February 1994) was a Red Army officer and a Hero of the Soviet Union, who served during World War II. With five hundred confirmed kills, he was one of the top Soviet snipers in the war and one of the deadliest snipers in history.

== Biography ==
Born to a peasant family in Glinkovsky District, Smolensk Oblast, Russia, Sidorenko attended ten grades of school, and later studied at the Penza Art College at Penza, south-east of Moscow. In 1939, he dropped out of college, and was conscripted into the Red Army for training at the Simferopol Military Infantry School, in the Crimean Peninsula.

=== World War II ===
In 1941, he fought in the Battle of Moscow, as a Junior Lieutenant of a mortar company. During the battle, he spent a lot of time teaching himself to snipe. His hunts for enemy soldiers were successful, prompting Sidorenko's commanders to order him to train others, who were chosen for their eyesight, weapons knowledge, and endurance. He first taught them theory, and then slowly started taking them out on combat missions with him. The Germans soon began fielding snipers of their own in Sidorenko's area of operation, to counter the new threat posed by him and his men.

Sidorenko became assistant commander of the Headquarters of the 1122nd Rifle Regiment, fighting as part of the 1st Baltic Front. Though he mainly instructed, he occasionally fought in battles, taking one of his trainees with him. On one of these excursions, he destroyed a tank and three tractors using incendiary bullets. However, he was wounded several times, most seriously in Estonia in 1944; as a result of which he remained hospitalized until the end of the war. While recuperating from this wound, Sidorenko was awarded the title of Hero of the Soviet Union on 4 June 1944; afterwards he was prohibited from seeing combat again by his superiors, as he was a valuable sniper trainer.

By the end of the war, he was credited with five hundred confirmed kills, and had trained over two hundred and fifty snipers. Ranked a Major, he was the most successful Soviet sniper of the Second World War, and used the Russian Mosin–Nagant rifle, equipped with a telescopic sight.

=== Post-war life ===
After the war ended, he retired from the Red Army, and settled down in Chelyabinsk Oblast, in the Ural Mountains, where he worked as the foreman of a coal mine. In 1974, he moved to the Republic of Dagestan, in the Caucasus. He died on 19 February 1994 in Kizlyar, Dagestan.

== Soviet documents ==
Award document, the Order of the Red Star, 31 December 1942:

[...] т. Сидоренко несколько раз участвовал в боях, где показал смелось и геройство. Находясь в обороне он истребил 129 фрицев и в то же время подготовил двух учеников-снайперов, у которых на счету 71 истребленный фриц. [...]
[...] Comrade Sidorenko participated in battles several times, where he showed courage and heroism. He killed 129 Fritz and at the same time trained two apprentice snipers, who accounted for 71 killed Fritz. [...]

— TsAMO, f. 33, op. 682526, d. 197

War Diary of the 1122 Rifle Regiment, page 130, 1 May 1943:

[...] Лучшему снайперу полка капитану Сидоренко уничтожившему 349 немцев, сего дня представили к присвоению звания героя Советского Союза. Тов. Сидоренко неоднократно участвовал в боях совместно с полком, был 8 раз ранен, своим личным примером увлекал бойцов в рукопашную схватку с врагом. В бою за дер. Шитики тов. Сидоренко первым ворвался в деревню и гранатами уничтожил ДЗОТ пр-ка со станковым пулеметом и расчетом. Бойцы и командиры нашего полка в суровой фронтовой обстановке отметили великий праздник всего советского народа. Знатные снайпера полка за день уничтожили 15 фашистов. Из них: Сидоренко - 4, Тищенко - 3, Мирзоян - 3 и другие. [...]
[...] Captain Sidorenko, the regiment's best sniper, who killed 349 Germans, has been nominated for the title of Hero of the Soviet Union. Comrade Sidorenko participated in many battles together with the regiment. He was 8 times wounded. With the personal example led soldiers by a bayonet fight with the enemy. In the battle for Shitiki village Comrade Sidorenko was the first to rush into the village and with grenades destroyed an enemy pillbox with a machine gun and a crew. Soldiers and commanders of our regiment in difficult front conditions celebrated the great holiday of the Soviet people. The regiment's distinguished snipers killed 15 fascists today. Of them: Sidorenko - 4, Tishchenko - 3, Mirzoyan - 3 and others. [...]

— TsAMO, f. 7788, op. 9137, d. 1
