= Vladimir Pchelintsev =

Soviet soldier (1919–1997)

Vladimir Nikolayevich Pchelintsev
- Владимир Николаевич Пчелинцев
- Born: 30 August 1919; Tambov, RSFSR
- Died: 27 July 1997 (aged 77); Zarya, Balashikha, Moscow Oblast, Russian Federation
- Military career
- Allegiance: Soviet Union
- Branch: Red Army
- Service years: 1941–1976
- Rank: Colonel
- Conflicts: World War II
- Awards: Hero of the Soviet Union; Order of Lenin; Order of the Patriotic War; Order of the Red Star; Order "For Service to the Homeland in the Armed Forces of the USSR"; Medal "For the Victory over Germany in the Great Patriotic War 1941–1945"; Jubilee Medal "Twenty Years of Victory in the Great Patriotic War 1941–1945"; Jubilee Medal "Thirty Years of Victory in the Great Patriotic War 1941–1945"; Jubilee Medal "Forty Years of Victory in the Great Patriotic War 1941–1945"; Jubilee Medal "50 Years of Victory in the Great Patriotic War 1941–1945"

Vladimir Nikolayevich Pchelintsev (Russian: Владимир Николаевич Пчелинцев; 30 August 1919 – 27 July 1997) was a Soviet sniper during World War II. Awarded the title Hero of the Soviet Union in 1942 for killing 152 enemy soldiers, he took part in a Soviet delegation with Lyudmila Pavlichenko to the United States. In one of his memoirs he claimed to have a tally of 456 enemy soldiers killed, although most historians believe the tally is around 152 kills.

== Early life ==
Pchelintsev was born on 20 August 1919 in Tambov. His father was a Red Army commander. During his upbringing his family relocated to Moscow, Leningrad, and Yaroslavl before settling in Petrozavodsk in 1936, where he graduated from his tenth grade of school in 1938. While studying at school, he was fond of gymnastics and mountaineering, but achieved the greatest success in shooting sports, and was a repeated winner of city and republic shooting competitions.

In 1938, Pchelintsev entered the geophysical specialty course of the geological exploration faculty of the Leningrad Mining Institute, which he successfully completed in June 1941. In 1939, while studying, he qualified as a sniper at the Osoaviakhim sniper school; on 22 February 1940, he became a marksman 1st class; on 14 March 1940, he received the title of Master of Sports of the USSR; and on 27 April 1940, he became a category III shooting sports instructor.

== World War II ==
Upon the German invasion of the Soviet Union in June 1941, Pchelintsev worked in defense construction in Karelia until volunteering to join the Red Army in July 1941. Initially, he was assigned to the 83rd NKVD Fighter Battalion, tasked with patrolling streets in Leningrad. In September, he was sent to the front lines as commander of a reconnaissance platoon in the 5th Rifle Battalion of the 11th Separate Rifle Brigade. On 6 September, his battalion took up positions on the right bank of the Neva River near the village of Nevskaya Dubrovka, covering the retreating units of the Red Army. On 8 September 1941, advancing motorized mechanized units of the Wehrmacht approached the battalion’s positions; on this day, Pchelintsev opened his sniper tally by shooting two advancing German soldiers with a sniper rifle.

When Pchelintsev's combat tally reached 36 enemy soldiers and officers killed, he began sniper training for his first group of students (8 people) and also turned to other snipers through the army newspaper of the 8th Army Leninsky Put, offering to organize an exchange of experience.

In January 1942, he was transferred to the 2nd Separate Battalion within the same brigade, where he was also tasked with sniper duties and played a role in establishing the sniper movement on the Leningrad Front. On the same month, Pchelintsev and his students were invited to an army rally of snipers in Koltushi. On 6 February 1942, he was awarded the title Hero of the Soviet Union for his first 102 kills, and he was awarded the Star of the Hero of the Soviet Union and a personalized sniper rifle at a gathering of the best snipers of the Leningrad Front, which was held in Smolny on 22 February. By the end of May 1942, Pchelintsev killed 144 German soldiers and officers. In July 1942, he was recalled from the front and was appointed as a teacher at the Central School of Sniper Instructors in Moscow, where he trained 45 new snipers.

From August 1942 to January 1943, he was in the United States as a delegate with Nikolai Krasavchenko and Lyudmila Pavlichenko. They arrived in Washington, D.C. for the International Anti-Fascist Congress of Students; they were invited to the White House on the day of their arrival, where they spent the night as guests of the president. On the third day of their visit, the three delegates spoke on the radio. Their speeches were broadcast by a major Washington radio station. They spoke about their experience of fighting the Nazis.

A special radio broadcast aired on 28 August in the United States described in detail the arrival of Pavlichenko, Krasavchenko, and Pchelintsev. The morning newspapers carried their photographs, conversations with them, and detailed descriptions of their arrival in Washington.

Pchelintsev spoke about the art of the sniper and concluded:

We can and will win. Stalin said so, so it will be.

The three delegates were then sent as part of a Soviet diplomatic delegation to visit Canada and England. After returning to the Soviet Union, he resumed teaching at the sniper school, but he repeatedly went to the active army, conducting combat training for school graduates and going on "sniper hunts".

From January 1943 to February 1944, Pchelintsev headed a ballistic laboratory research station at a sniper school, and in October, he graduated from the Vystrel course. In January 1945, he was made assistant to the head for the department for repatriation of foreign citizens. Reliable sources estimate he killed 150 to 154 enemy soldiers and trained 45 new snipers, although Pchelintsev claimed in his memoir to have a tally of 456:

By January 1943, my combat score was already one hundred and fifty-two fascists with one hundred and fifty-four shots. Well, during the entire war this figure rose to four hundred and fifty-six.

== Postwar ==
Having left of office for repatriation of foreign citizens in 1947, Pchelintsev remained in the military. He visited many Western countries that were allied with the Soviet Union in World War II. In May 1952, he went on to graduate from the Budyonny Military Academy of the Signal Corps in Leningrad.

From June 1952 to February 1954, Pchelintsev served as senior engineer for airborne radio equipment at the Fighter Aviation Defense Training Center in Volodarsk. He then became senior engineer for experimental radio technical stations at the headquarters for Soviet Fighter Aviation Defense, where he remained until May 1954, having become an assistant to a permanent member of the country's Scientific and Technical Committee of the Air Force. He left that post in May 1955 before becoming deputy head of the department for radio and technical service for the Air Force Northern Group of Forces, based in Poland.

From March 1959 to December 1960, Pchelintsev was head of the radio engineering department of the Soviet Air Defense Forces in the headquarters of the Baltic Military District, and from then to 1964, he was head of radio countermeasures department of operational command in the same headquarters. In September 1964, he became head of the electronic warfare department of the Air Defense General Staff, and from December 1968 to March 1975, he was the Head of the Electronic Warfare Service of Air Defense General Staff.

During those postings, Pchelintsev headed groups of Soviet specialists in electronic warfare visiting Eastern bloc states and being sent to Vietnam in 1968. In 1970, Pchelintsev was sent to Egypt during the War of Attrition as part of a group of officers and generals led by the Commander-in-Chief of the Soviet Air Defense Forces, Marshal of the Soviet Union Pavel Batitsky, to organize the air defense of Egypt. He also went to Egypt in 1975 as an electronic warfare planning consultant.

After retiring from the military with the rank of colonel in 1976, Pchelintsev served as 1st Deputy Chairman of the Federation of Shooting Sports of the USSR and the Chairman of the Central Council of the All-Union "Sniper" Club. He lived in the city of Balashikha, Moscow Oblast. He worked on the repatriation committee and was an active participant in military-patriotic work with youth. He died in Zarya, Moscow Oblast, on 22 July 1997 and was buried in the Nikolo-Arkhangelsk cemetery.

== Awards ==
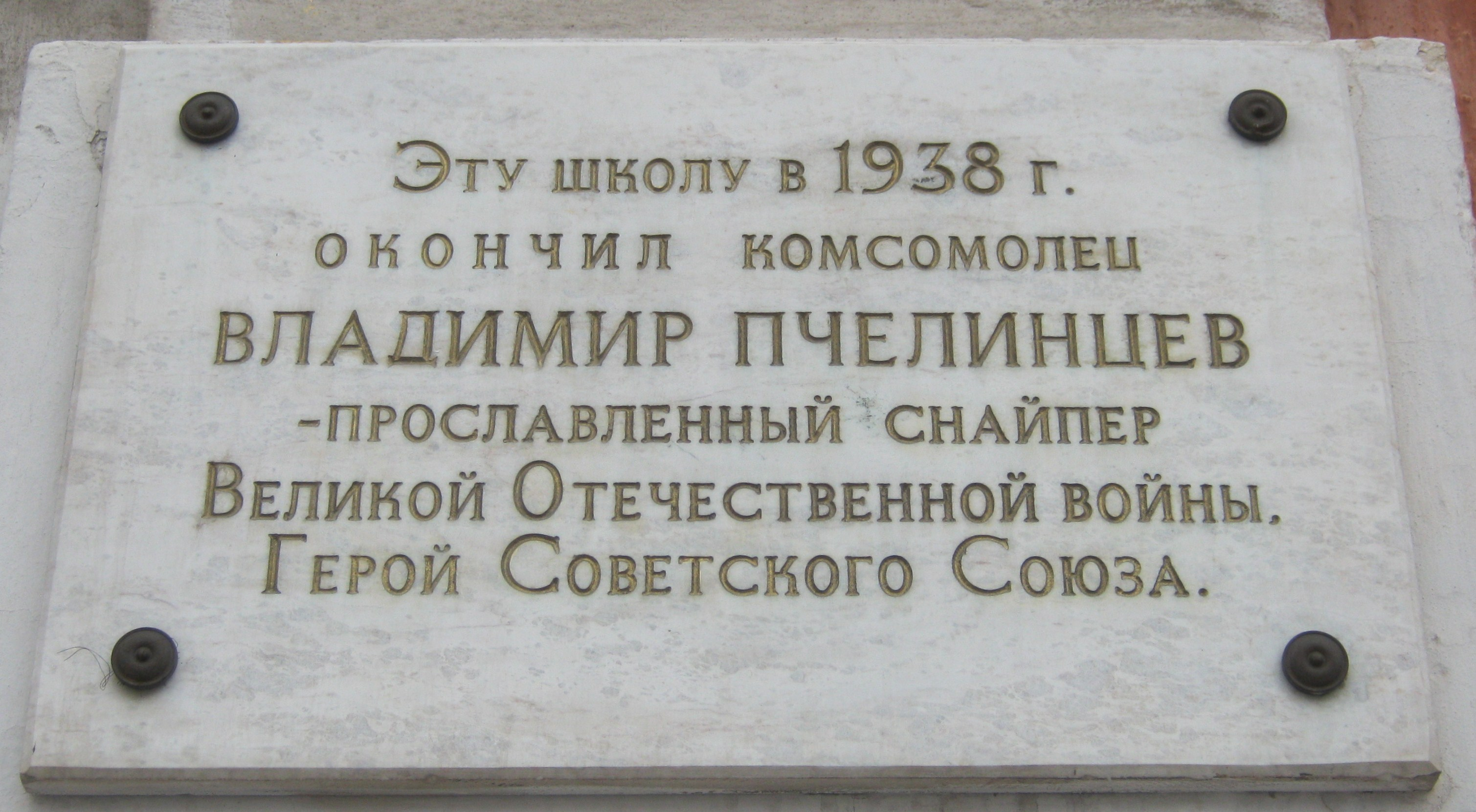
Memorial plaque on the building of school No. 9 in Petrozavodsk

- Hero of the Soviet Union (6 February 1942)
- Order of Lenin (6 February 1942)
- Order of the Patriotic War 1st class (11 March 1985)
- Order of the Red Star (30 December 1956)
- Order "For Service to the Homeland in the Armed Forces of the USSR" 3rd class (20 April 1956)
- campaign and jubilee medals
