= Kuka, Punjab =

Kuka
- Village
- Location in Punjab, India Kuka (India)
- Coordinates: 31.586304°N 75.450432°E
- Country: India
- State: Punjab

Languages
  - Official: Punjabi
- Time zone: UTC+5:30 (IST)
- Vehicle registration: PB-09

Kuka is a village in Kapurthala district in Punjab, India. It was the native village of the legendary Baba Harbhajan Singh, a soldier revered by the Indian Army in Sikkim.
