= Johnson Paudash =

Canadian sniper

- Born: 29 January 1875; Hiawatha, Ontario, Canada
- Died: 26 October 1959 (aged 84)
- Burial place: Riverside Cemetery, Lindsay, Ontario, Canada
- Relatives: Florence Paudash (wife)
- Military career
- Allegiance: Canada
- Branch: Canadian Expeditionary Force
- Service years: 1914–1918
- Rank: Lance Corporal
- Service number: 59779
- Unit: 21st Battalion (Eastern Ontario), CEF
- Conflicts: World War I
- Awards: Military Medal

Lance Corporal Johnson Paudash MM (29 January 1875 – 26 October 1959) was an acclaimed Canadian sniper during the First World War.

== Biography ==
Paudash, an Ojibwa native, joined the 21st Battalion (Eastern Ontario), CEF on 11 November 1914 at Kingston, Ontario (his younger brother, George Paudash, 24, also enlisted at the same time). After training he embarked aboard the SS Metagama on 6 May 1915 and sailed to Great Britain. In July 1915 he was promoted to lance corporal and in mid-September of the same year arrived in France. On 22 September, whilst fighting at Messines, Paudash was shot in the right leg. After recuperating from this wound, Paudash rejoined his unit south of Ypres in Belgium. It was here that Paudash showed the skills required to be a sniper.

== Post war ==
Paudash became a civil servant with the federal government. He was considered by the Indian Commission to be "almost as smart as any lawyer regarding Indian treaties or legal paper". Johnson Paudash was responsible for bringing the commission's attention to the errors regarding lands described in or thought to be governed by earlier treaties and helped correctly define the treaty borders for the 1923 treaty.
