= Lucky Bisht =

Indian spy and sniper

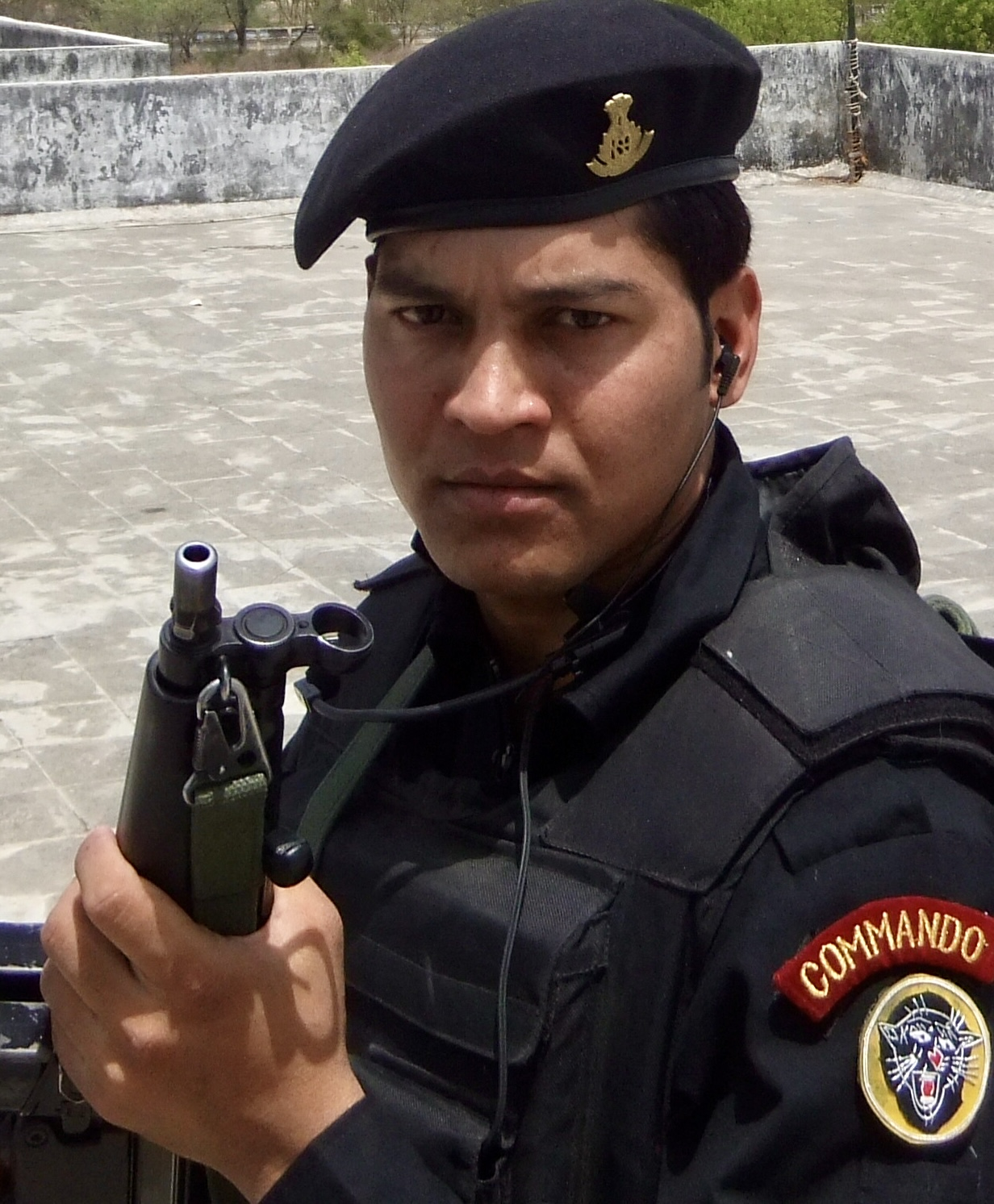
- Bisht in 2018, as a member of the National Security Guard (NSG)
- Born: 1 June 1988 (age 38); Gangolihat, Pithoragarh district, Uttar Pradesh (present day Uttarakhand), India
- Occupations: Former commando; spy; writer
- Years active: 2003–2018
- Military career
- Education: National Security Guard; Belgaum Military School; Army War College, Mhow; Explosives engineering Research and Analysis Wing; Assam Rifles
- Branch: Army
- Service years: 15 years 6 months 10 Days
- Rank: Commando

Lakshman Singh Bisht (popularly known as Lucky Bisht) is an Indian former spy, sniper and National Security Guard commando. He served as a personal bodyguard to politicians such as Tarun Gogoi, L. K. Advani, Chandrababu Naidu, Rajnath Singh and Prime Minister Narendra Modi.

== Early life and military career ==
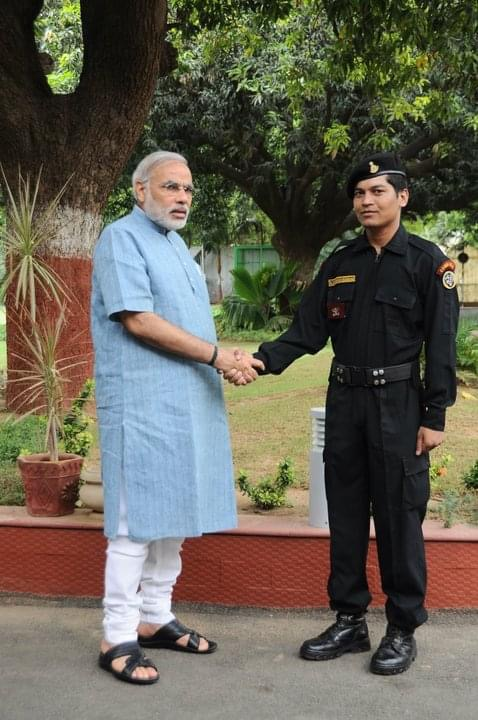
Lucky Bisht (right) with Prime Minister Narendra Modi (left)

Bisht was born in Gangolihat, Pithoragarh district, Uttarakhand. His grandfather died in the Indo-Pakistani War of 1971. He completed his early education at Kendriya Vidhyalaya No. 5, Mansarovar, Jaipur, and eventually joined the special forces.

Bisht claims he served as a bodyguard for Narendra Modi during his tenure as chief minister of Gujarat. In 2022, Bisht was interviewed by Hussain Zaidi about his life, career and experiences as an intelligence operative for the Research and Analysis Wing (RAW). Bisht claims that he was part of the security detail for US President Barack Obama during his visit to India on 8 November 2010. He has also claimed to have worked with various government security agencies, including the National Security Guard, Indian Army, Research and Analysis Wing, Special Forces and Assam Rifles.

== Prediction ==
In December 2024, during an interview with Navbharat Times, Bisht asserted that the government of Nepal under K. P. Sharma Oli would collapse. On 10 September 2025, it fell during the Nepalese Gen Z protests. Several media outlets reported on this prediction, including the Economic Times, Times Now, DNA, ABP News, and Aaj Tak.

== Books about Bisht ==
A book on his life, titled R.A.W. Hitman: The Real Story of Agent Lima, was published by Simon & Schuster on 4 July 2023 in the United States and on 6 July 2023 in India. It was written by Hussain Zaidi.

Bisht authored the book R.A.W Hitman 2: The Assassinations, which was published by Simon & Schuster on December 3, 2024.

== Murder case ==
Bisht faced accusations for the assassination of Raju Pargai and Amit Arya. On 5 September 2011, the Uttarakhand Police charged him with a double murder charge. He spent over three years in jail, being transferred to 11 different facilities during this period. He was released on 11 March 2015. Ultimately, the Nainital district court acquitted him on 6 March 2018 due to a lack of evidence. Bisht rejoined the Special Forces in 2018 and retired in 2019 before venturing into Bollywood later that year.

== Filmography ==
Bisht made his entry into the Indian film industry as a producer in 2019, and had a cameo in the web series Sena: Guardians of the Nation, which was released on Amazon.

Year	Title	Producer	writer	Note	Ref
2019	Ehsaas	Yes		Album	
2019	3D Night	Yes		Film	
2019	The Maniac	Yes		Film	
2019	Kaun Saab (Who is it?)	Yes		Film	
2019	Super Laundeys (Indian TV series)	Yes		Web Series	
2019	Acche Din	Yes		Film	
2019	Omaya	Yes		Film	
2020	Un Lamhon mein	Yes		Album	
Upcoming	Victoria Cross Gabbar Singh Negi	Yes	Yes	Film	

== Awards ==
- In 2009, he was honored as the Best Commando for his exceptional performance in the field.

== See also ==
- List of snipers
- Research and Analysis Wing
- Killings of Raju Pargai and Amit Arya
