= Bruno Sutkus =

Recipient of the Iron Cross (1924–2003)

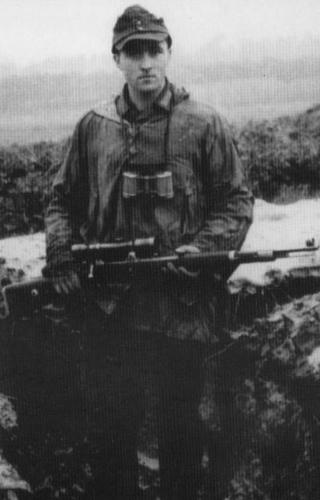
- Photo taken in autumn of 1944 in the Carpathian Mountains
- Born: 14 May 1924; Tannenwalde, East Prussia
- Died: 29 August 2003 (aged 79)
- Military career
- Allegiance: Nazi Germany
- Branch: Army
- Service years: 1943–May 8, 1945
- Rank: Obergefreiter
- Unit: 68th Infantry Division
- Conflicts: World War II: Eastern Front
- Awards: Iron Cross 2nd & 1st class Infantry Assault Badge; Wound Badge (silver); Sniper's Badge (gold)

Bruno Sutkus (Lithuanian: Bronius Sutkus, 14 May 1924 – 29 August 2003) was a Lithuanian-German sniper in the 68th Infantry Division of the German Army, on the Eastern Front of World War II, and was credited with 209 kills. Every kill was recorded in an individual "sniper's book" and had to be confirmed by at least one observer and authenticated by the battalion commander. Facsimile copies of various diary pages are reproduced in Sutkus' memoir. After the dissolution of the Soviet Union, Sutkus held lectures for Lithuanian soldiers and presented his wartime records to Lithuanian officers.

== Biography ==
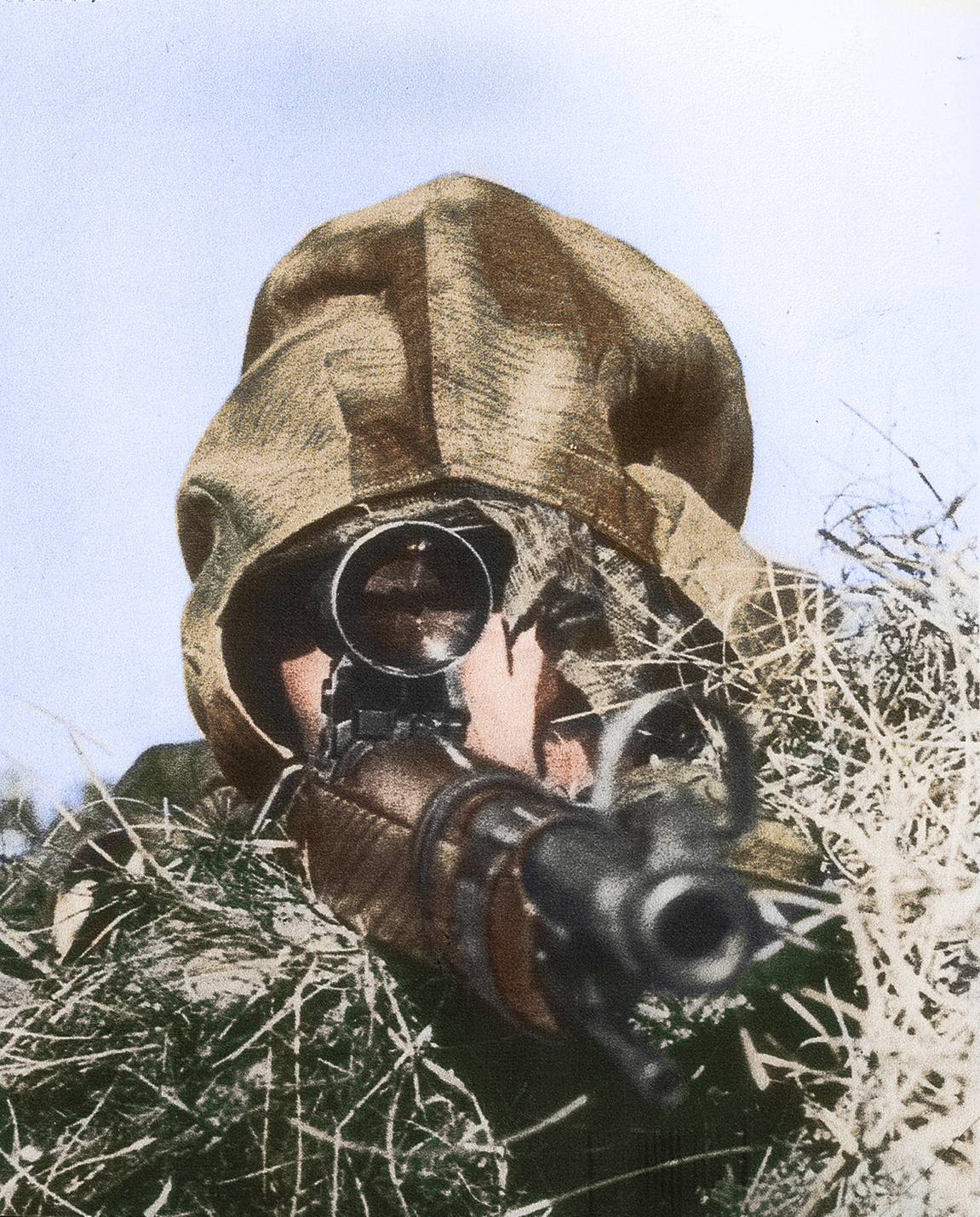
Bruno Sutkus in camouflage

Sutkus was born in Tannenwalde, then a suburb of Königsberg, East Prussia. Because his father was Lithuanian, Sutkus was not considered automatically German; he had to apply for German nationality. Since no application was made, he remained officially stateless until 1941, when he became a naturalised German. He joined the Hitler Youth in 1938, achieving the rank of a Scharführer. When he was 18 years old he became a member of the SA, where his shooting skills were acknowledged, and he was given a rifle to take home and practise marksmanship.

Sutkus trained as a sniper from August 1943 through the end of December 1943 at the Sniper School in Vilnius, before being assigned to the 196th Grenadier Regiment of the 68th Infantry Division. In January 1945, while recovering from a wound, he was promoted and informed that he had been appointed as an instructor at a sniper school.

In his autobiography, Sutkus describes that after the war he came into contact with the anti-Soviet Lithuanian resistance, how he was captured and tortured by the KGB. He was in possession of forged documents declaring him to be stateless and of having worked throughout the war as a farm labourer, but knew the Russians suspected him of having served in the Wehrmacht as a sniper. So Sutkus decided to stay together with several Lithuanians he knew who were deported to Siberia for forced labour, partly to escape Soviet attention, and expecting to be deported anyway.

By the time the Russians had the evidence to prosecute him for the war crime of being a sniper, West German Chancellor Konrad Adenauer had negotiated amnesties for many Germans being detained in the Soviet Union. He worked on collectives, in the Taiga forests and down the pits at Sheernkov from 1949 until 1971, when he was allowed to relocate to Vilnius. Sutkus went into voluntary banishment to accompany a Lithuanian woman, Antanina (d. 1995), nineteen years his senior, who had been linked to the resistance. He had a son, Vytautas, by her in 1951. In 1991, after the collapse of the Soviet Union, Sutkus, now Lithuanian after having been forced to accept Soviet citizenship, visited Germany. He wrote a memoir and helped train the Lithuanian army after Lithuania gained independence, giving lectures. In 1994, he received a certificate of German citizenship and a passport and relocated to Germany in 1997.

== Awards ==
- Iron Cross 2nd Class on 6 July 1944
- Wound Badge in black on 7 September 1944
- Iron Cross 1st Class on 16 November 1944
- Sniper's Badge (1st class - gold) on 21 November 1944
- Infantry Assault Badge in silver on 29 November 1944
- Wound Badge in silver on 1 March 1945
