= Sniper =

Highly trained marksman

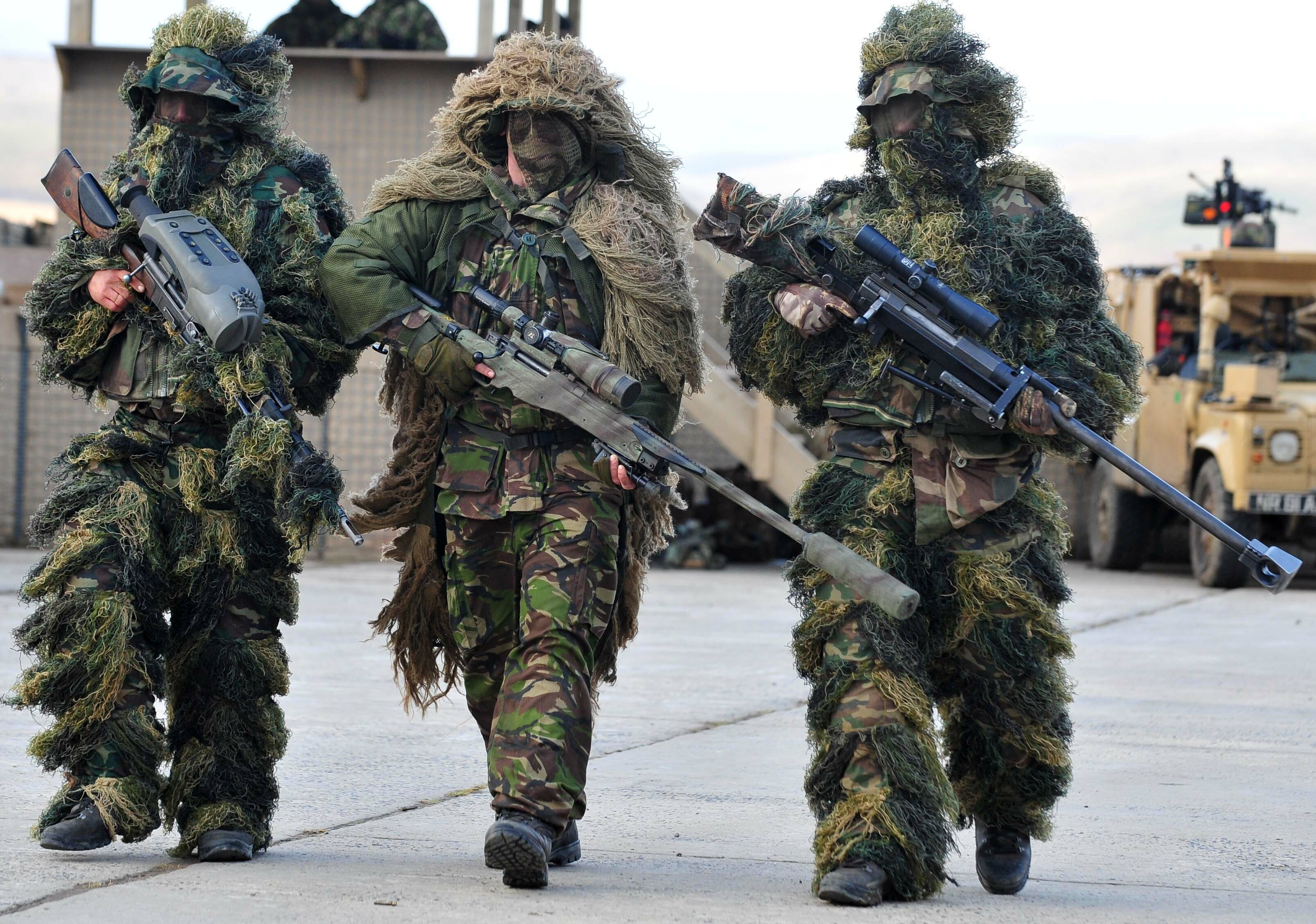
- French and British (center) snipers equipped with FR F2, Accuracy International AWM and PGM Hécate II rifles (left to right, 2012) and camouflage ghillie suits

Occupation
- Occupation type: Military, paramilitary, law enforcement
- Activity sectors: Use of high-precision rifles and special reconnaissance

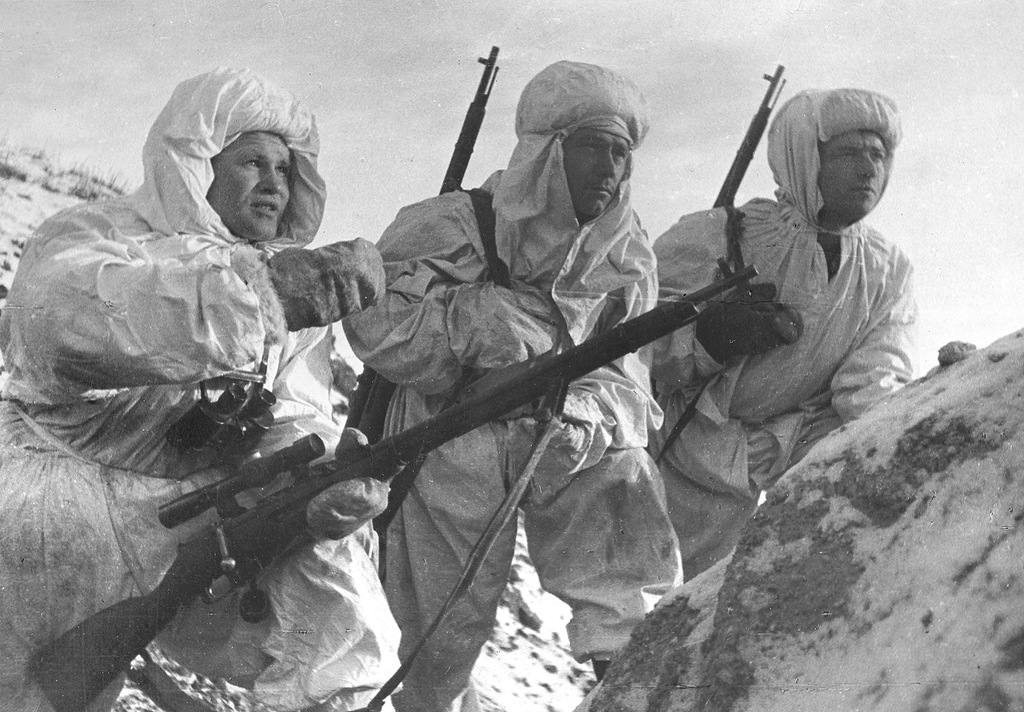
Vasily Zaytsev, left, and other Soviet snipers equipped with Mosin–Nagant M1891/30 during the Battle of Stalingrad in December 1942

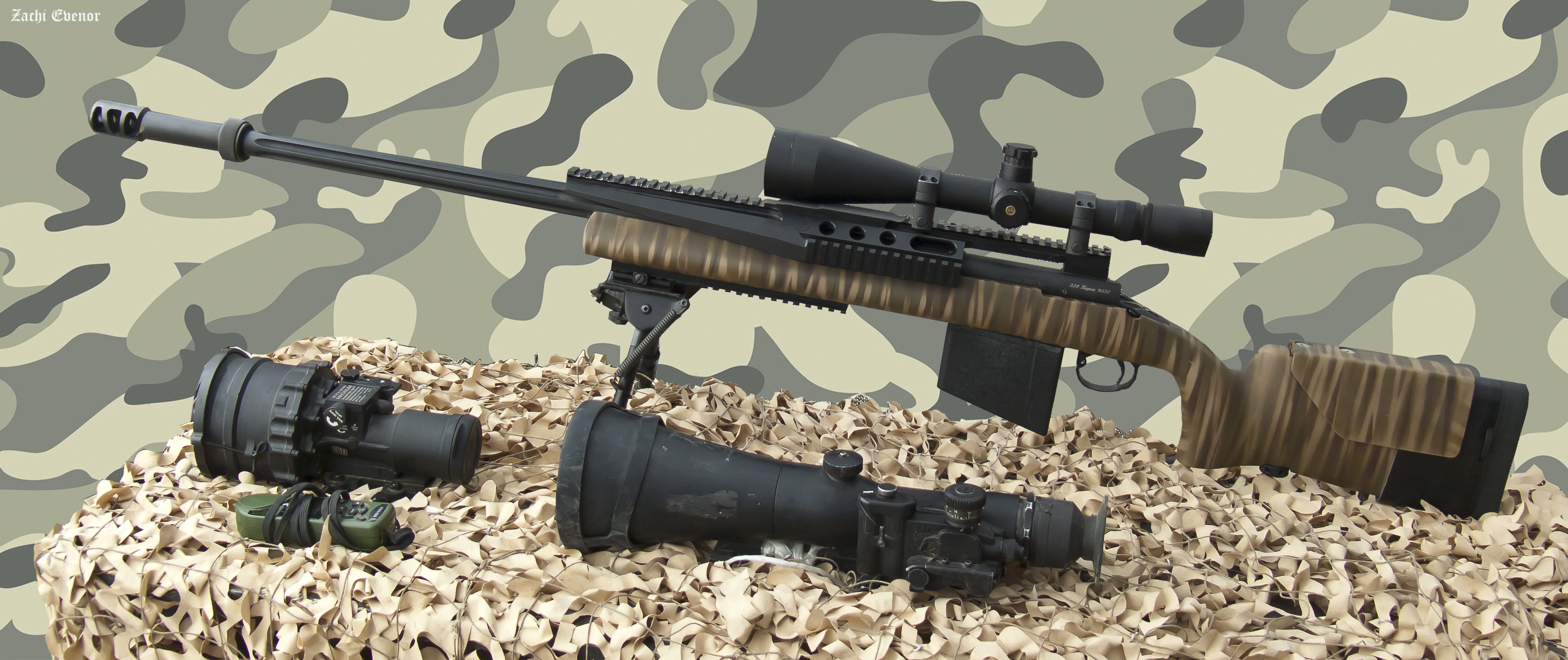
A modern sniper weapon system which consists of a sniper rifle (here Barak HTR 2000 chambered in .338 Lapua Magnum), telescopic sight (Leupold Mark IV x10), and additional optics

A sniper is a military or paramilitary marksman who engages targets from positions of concealment or at distances exceeding the target's detection capabilities. Snipers generally have specialized training and are equipped with telescopic sights. Modern snipers use high-precision rifles and high-magnification optics. They often also serve as scouts or observers feeding tactical information back to their units or command headquarters.

In addition to long-range and high-grade marksmanship, military snipers are trained in a variety of special operation techniques: detection, stalking, target range estimation methods, camouflage, tracking, bushcraft, field craft, infiltration, special reconnaissance and observation, surveillance and target acquisition.

== Etymology ==
The name sniper comes from the verb to snipe, which originated in the 1770s among soldiers in British India in reference to shooting snipes, a wader that was considered an extremely challenging game bird for hunters due to its alertness, camouflaging color and erratic flight behavior. Snipe hunters therefore needed to be stealthy in addition to being good trackers and marksmen. In the 18th century, letters sent home by English officers in India referred to a day's rough shooting as "going sniping", as it took a skilled flintlock sportsman a lot of patience and endurance to wing-shoot a snipe in flight. Accomplishing such a shot was regarded as exceptional. During the late 18th century, the term snipe shooting was simplified to sniping. This evolved to the agent noun sniper, first appearing by the 1820s. The term sniper became commonplace in the First World War.

The older term sharpshooter comes from the calque of German word Scharfschütze, in use by British newspapers as early as 1801. The word alludes to good marksmanship, itself descendent of the shooting competitions (Schützenfeste) that took place throughout the year in Munich in the 15th century. Small companies of shooters (Schützenfähnlein) from the German states and Swiss cantons would form teams of Scharfschützen for such popular competitions, proudly carrying flags depicting a crossbow on one side and a target musket on the other. The earliest known date for the creation of a shooting club formed specifically for the use of firearms comes from Lucerne, Switzerland, where one club has a charter dating from 1466. During the American Civil War, Confederate marksmen equipped with the imported Whitworth rifles were known as the Whitworth Sharpshooters.

== Modern warfare ==
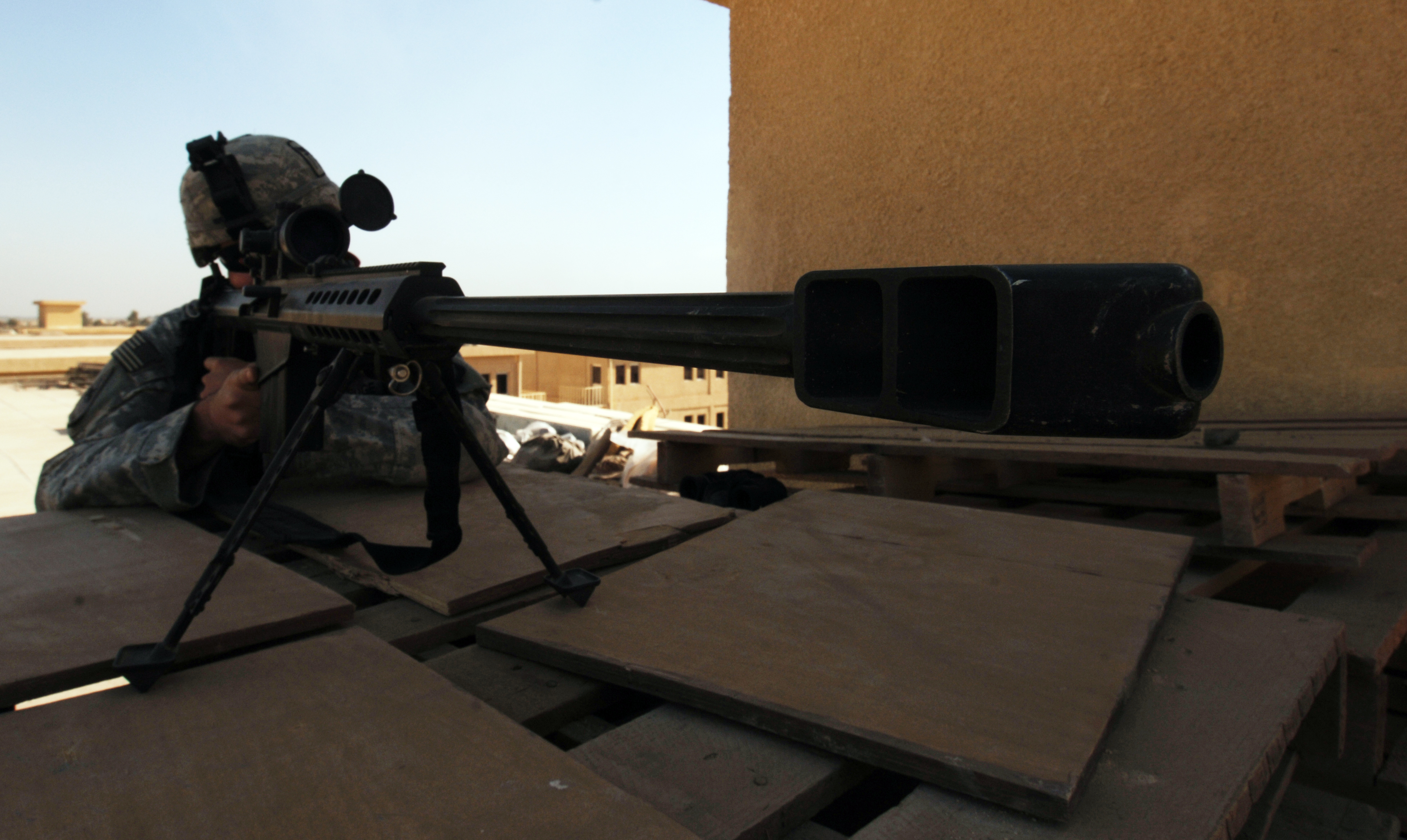
Over-watch being provided by an army sergeant during a high-level meeting, Baghdad, Iraq

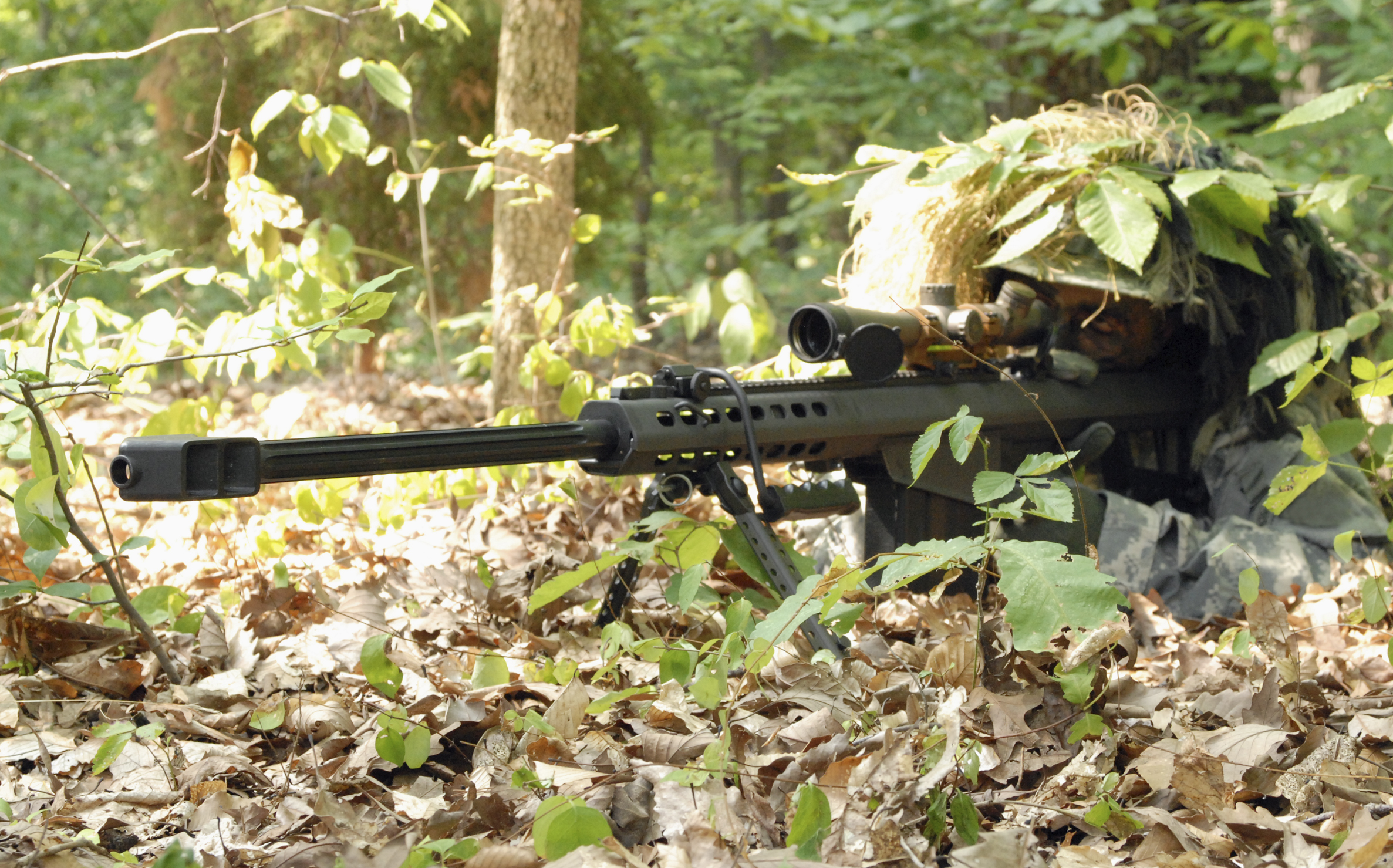
A U.S. Army sniper using a Barrett M82

=== Military doctrine ===
Different countries use different military doctrines regarding snipers in military units, settings, and tactics.

A sniper's primary function in modern warfare is to stay concealed at all times and avoid detection. They provide detailed surveillance from a concealed position, often at long range, and reduce the enemy's combat ability by shooting high-value targets (especially officers and other key personnel). In the process, they cause disruption, pinning down and demoralizing the enemy. Typical sniper missions include managing intelligence information they gather during reconnaissance, target acquisition and impact feedback for air strikes and artillery, assisting employed combat force with accurate fire support and counter-sniper tactics, killing enemy commanders, selecting targets of opportunity, and even destruction of military equipment, which tend to require use of anti-materiel rifles in the larger calibers such as the .50 BMG, like the Barrett M82, McMillan Tac-50, and Denel NTW-20.

Soviet- and Russian-derived military doctrines include squad-level snipers. Snipers have increasingly been demonstrated as useful by US and UK forces in the recent Iraq campaign in a fire support role to cover the movement of infantry, especially in urban areas.

Military snipers from the US, UK and other countries that adopt their military doctrine are typically deployed in two-man sniper teams consisting of a shooter and a spotter. A common practice is for a shooter and a spotter to take turns to avoid eye fatigue. In most recent combat operations occurring in large densely populated towns, such as Fallujah, Iraq, two teams would be deployed together to increase their security and effectiveness in an urban environment. A sniper team would be armed with a long-range weapon and a rapid-firing shorter-ranged weapon in case of close quarter combat.

The German doctrine of largely independent snipers and emphasis on concealment, developed during the Second World War, has been most influential on modern sniper tactics, and is currently used throughout Western militaries (examples are specialized camouflage clothing, concealment in terrain and emphasis on coup d'œil).

=== Sniper teams ===
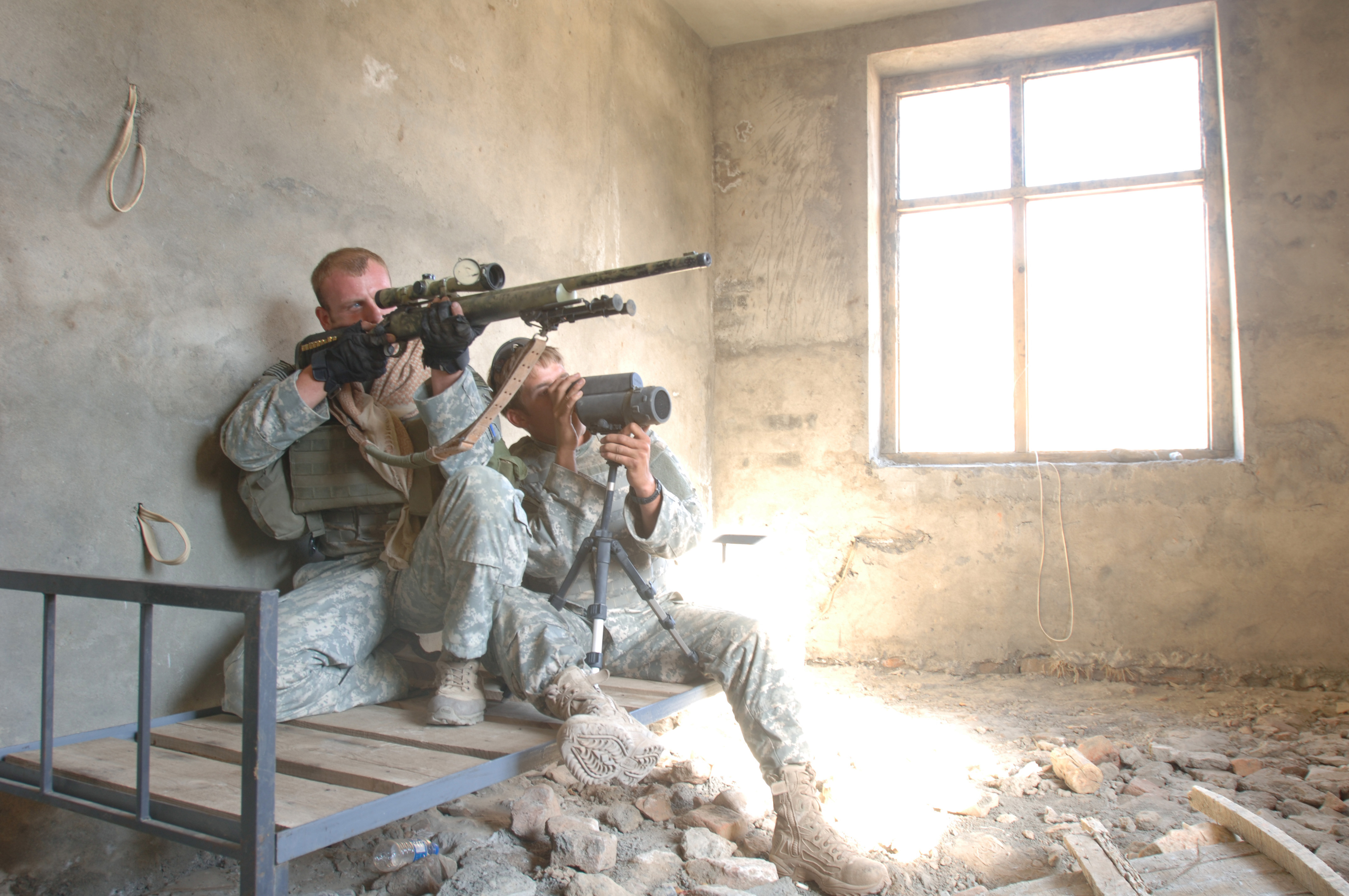
A U.S. Army sniper team from Jalalabad Provincial Reconstruction Team (PRT)

Sniper rifles are classified as crew-served in the United States military. A sniper team (or sniper cell) consists of a combination of at least one primary weapon operator (i.e. the shooter) with other support personnel and force protection elements, such as a spotter or a flanker. Within the Table of Organization and Equipment for both the United States Army and Marine Corps, the shooter does not operate alone, but has a backup shooter trained to fulfill multiple roles in addition to being sniper-qualified in the operation of the main weapon.

The shooter focuses mainly on firing the shot, while the spotter assists in observation of targets, accounts for atmospheric conditions and handles ancillary tasks such as immediate security of their location, communication with other parties (e.g. directing artillery fire and close air support). A flanker is an extra teammate who is tasked to act as a sentry observing areas not immediately visible to the sniper and spotter, assisting with the team's rear security and perimeter defense, and therefore are usually armed with a faster-firing weapon such as an assault rifle, battle rifle or designated marksman rifle. Both the spotter and flanker carry additional ammunition and associated equipment.

The spotter is responsible for detecting, identifying and assigning priority of targets for the shooter, as well as assessing the outcome of the shot. Using a spotting scope and/or a rangefinder, the spotter will predict the external ballistics and read the wind speed using an anemometer or physical indicators like the mirage caused by ground heat. Also, in conjunction with the shooter, the spotter will calculate the distance, shooting angle (slant range), mil-related correction, interference by atmospheric factors and the required leads for moving targets. It is not unusual for the spotter to be equipped with a ballistic table, a notebook or a tablet computer specifically for performing these calculations.

=== Longest recorded sniper kill ===
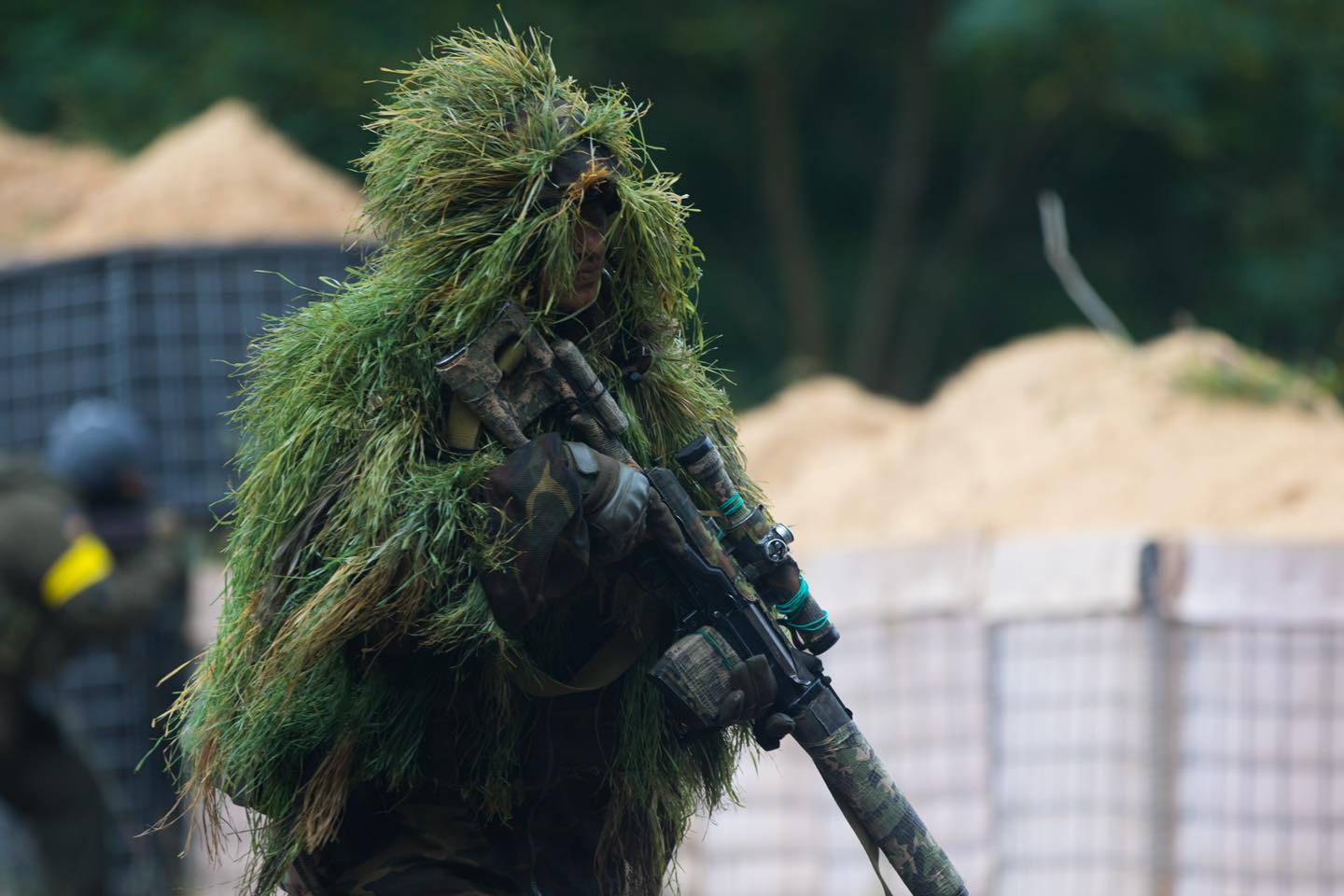
Ukrainian sniper during the military training near the Belarus border in 2022

The longest confirmed sniper kill in combat was achieved by an undisclosed member of the Security Service of Ukraine in November 2023, hitting a Russian soldier at a distance of 3,800 m (4,156 yd) during the Russian invasion of Ukraine.

The previous record holder was a member of the Canadian JTF2 special forces who in June 2017 achieved a hit at a distance of 3,540 m (3,871 yd).

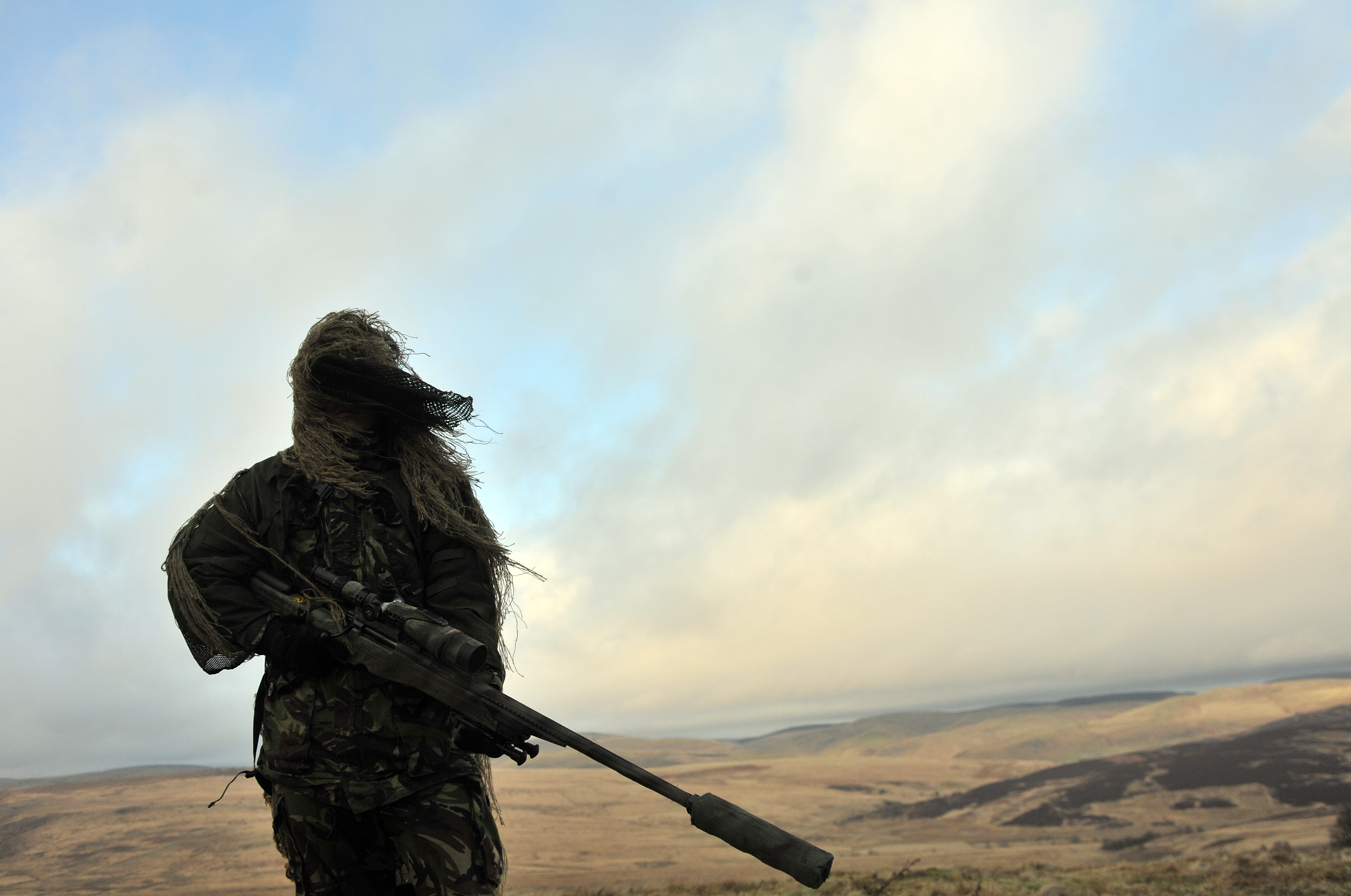
British sniper in training in Northumberland, 2010

In November 2009, Craig Harrison, a Corporal of Horse (CoH) in the Blues and Royals RHG/D of the British Army struck two Taliban machine gunners consecutively south of Musa Qala in Helmand Province in Afghanistan at a range of 2,475 m (2,707 yd) or 1.54 miles using a L115A3 Long Range Rifle. The QTU Lapua external ballistics software, using continuous doppler drag coefficient (C_{d}) data provided by Lapua, predicts that such shots traveling 2,475 m (2,707 yd) would likely have struck their targets after nearly 6.0 seconds of flight time, having lost 93% of their kinetic energy, retaining 255 m/s (840 ft/s) of their original 936 m/s (3,070 ft/s) velocity, and having dropped 121.39 m (398 ft 3 in) or 2.8° from the original bore line. Due to the extreme distances and travel time involved, even a light cross-breeze of 2.7 m/s (6.0 mph) would have diverted such shots 9.2 m (360 in) off target, which would have required compensation.

The calculation assumes a flat-fire scenario (a situation where the shooting and target positions are at equal elevation), using British military custom high-pressure .338 Lapua Magnum cartridges, loaded with 16.2 g (250 gr) Lapua LockBase B408 bullets, fired at 936 m/s (3,071 ft/s) muzzle velocity under the following on-site (average) atmospheric conditions: barometric pressure: 1,019 hPa (30.1 inHg) at sea-level equivalent or 899 hPa (26.5 inHg) on-site, humidity: 25.9%, and temperature: 15 °C (59 °F) in the region for November 2009, resulting in an air density ρ = 1.0854 kg/m^{3} at the 1,043 m (3,422 ft) elevation of Musa Qala. Harrison mentions in reports that the environmental conditions were perfect for long range shooting, "... no wind, mild weather, clear visibility." In a BBC interview, Harrison reported it took about nine shots for him and his spotter to initially range the target successfully.

== Military history ==
Before the development of rifling, firearms were smoothbore and inaccurate over long distance. Barrel rifling was invented at the end of the fifteenth century, but was only employed in large cannons. Over time, rifling, along with other gunnery advances, has increased the performance of modern firearms.

=== 1701–1800 ===
Hunting terminology was quickly adapted to warfare by British soldiers. In a 1772 letter, a soldier described enemies firing very accurately:

… in erecting our batteries, the people frequently play tricks, by putting a hat with a cockade in it on a spunge staff, which the enemy fire at and often hit, to the diversion of the soldiery, who humorously call it sniping, and watch the flash to return the fire.

At the Battles of Saratoga, Morgan's Riflemen positioned themselves in trees and used early model rifles to target senior British officers. Most notably, Timothy Murphy shot and killed General Simon Fraser of Balnain on 7 October 1777 at a distance of about 400 yards.

In early 1800, Colonel Coote Manningham and Lieutenant-Colonel the Hon. William Stewart of the British Army proposed using what they had learned while leading light infantry to establish a special unit of marksmen. Subsequently raised as the "Experimental Corps of Riflemen", they were armed with the formidable Baker rifle rather than the inaccurate smoothbore muskets used by most troops at that time. Through the combination of a leather wad and tight grooves on the inside of the barrel (rifling), this weapon was far more accurate, though slower to load. On 25 August 1800, three companies, under the command of Stewart, spearheaded an amphibious landing at Ferrol, Spain.

=== 1801–1900 ===
The term, "sharp shooter" was in use in British newspapers as early as 1801. In the Edinburgh Advertiser, 23 June 1801, can be found the following quote in a piece about the North British Militia; "This Regiment has several Field Pieces, and two companies of Sharp Shooters, which are very necessary in the modern Stile of War". The term appears even earlier, around 1781, in Continental Europe, translated from the German Scharfschütze. Scouts in the Ashanti army were made up of professional hunters who used their skill as marksmen to snipe at advancing enemy forces in response to detection by the enemy. They executed this often from a perch high in trees. The Whitworth rifle was arguably the first long-range sniper rifle in the world. A muzzleloader designed by Sir Joseph Whitworth, a prominent British engineer, it used polygonal rifling instead, which meant that the projectile did not have to bite into grooves as was done with conventional rifling. The Whitworth rifle was far more accurate than the Pattern 1853 Enfield, which had shown some weaknesses during the recent Crimean War. At trials in 1857 which tested the accuracy and range of both weapons, Whitworth's design outperformed the Enfield at a rate of about three to one. The Whitworth rifle was capable of hitting the target at a range of 2,000 yards, whereas the Enfield could only manage it at 1,400 yards.

During the Crimean War, the first optical sights were designed to fit onto rifles. Much of this pioneering work was the brainchild of Colonel D. Davidson, using optical sights produced by Chance Brothers of Birmingham. This allowed a marksman to observe and target objects more accurately at a greater distance than ever before. The telescopic sight, or scope, was originally fixed and could not be adjusted, which therefore limited its range.

Despite its success at the trials, the rifle was not adopted by the British Army. However, the Whitworth Rifle Company was able to sell the weapon to the French army, and also to the Confederacy during the American Civil War, where both the Union and Confederate armies employed sharpshooters. The most notable incident was during the Battle of Spotsylvania Court House, where on 9 May 1864, Union General John Sedgwick was killed by a Confederate Whitworth sharpshooter at a range of about 1,000 yards (910 meters) after saying the enemy "couldn't hit an elephant at this distance".

=== Second Boer War ===
During the Boer War the latest breech-loading rifled guns with magazines and smokeless powder were used by both sides. The British were equipped with the Lee–Metford rifle, while the Boers had received the latest Mauser rifles from Germany. In the open terrain of South Africa the marksmen were a crucial component to the outcome of the battle.

The first British sniper unit began life as the Lovat Scouts, a Scottish Highland regiment formed in 1899, that earned high praise during the Second Boer War (1899–1902). The unit was formed by Lord Lovat and reported to an American, Major Frederick Russell Burnham, the British Army Chief of Scouts under Lord Roberts. Burnham fittingly described these scouts as "half wolf and half jackrabbit.". Just like their Boer scout opponents, these scouts were well practised in the arts of marksmanship, field craft, map reading, observation, and military tactics. They were skilled woodsmen and practitioners of discretion: "He who shoots and runs away, lives to shoot another day." They were also the first known military unit to wear a ghillie suit. Hesketh Hesketh-Prichard said of them that "keener men never lived", and that "Burnham was the greatest scout of our time." Burnham distinguished himself in wars in South Africa, Rhodesia, and in Arizona fighting the Apaches, and his definitive work, Scouting on Two Continents, provides a dramatic and enlightening picture of what a sniper was at the time and how he operated.

After the war, this regiment went on to formally become the first official sniper unit, then better known as sharpshooters.

=== World War I ===
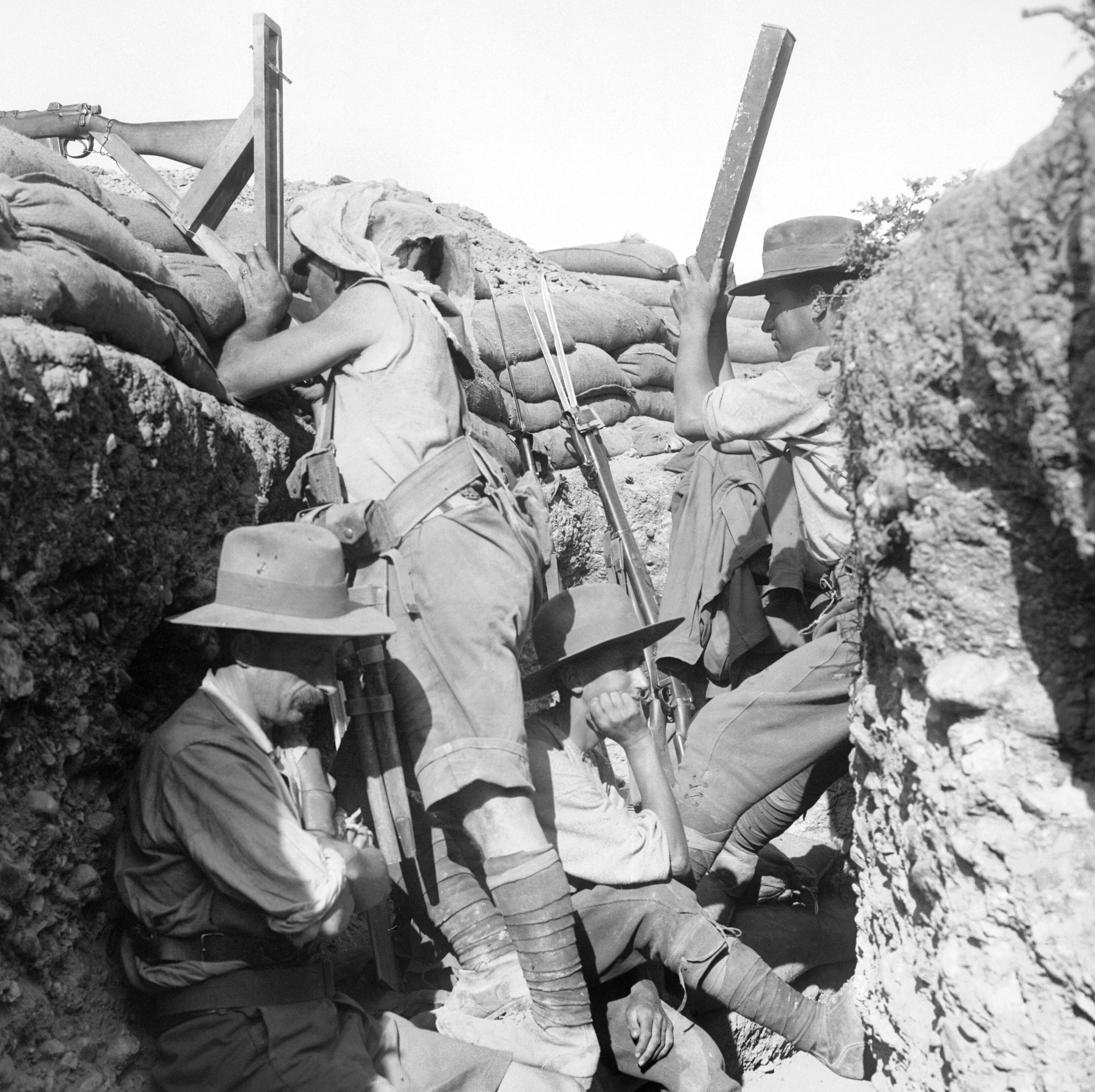
An Australian sniper aims a periscope-equipped rifle at Gallipoli in 1915. The spotter beside him is helping to find targets with his own periscope.

During World War I, snipers appeared as deadly sharpshooters in the trenches. At the start of the war, only Imperial Germany had troops that were issued scoped sniper rifles. Although sharpshooters existed on all sides, the Germans specially equipped some of their soldiers with scoped rifles that could pick off enemy soldiers showing their heads out of their trench. At first the French and British believed such hits to be coincidental hits, until the German scoped rifles were discovered. During World War I, the German army received a reputation for the deadliness and efficiency of its snipers, partly because of the high-quality lenses that German industry could manufacture.

During the First World War, the static movement of trench warfare and a need for protection from snipers created a requirement for loopholes both for discharging firearms and for observation. Often a steel plate was used with a "key hole", which had a rotating piece to cover the loophole when not in use.

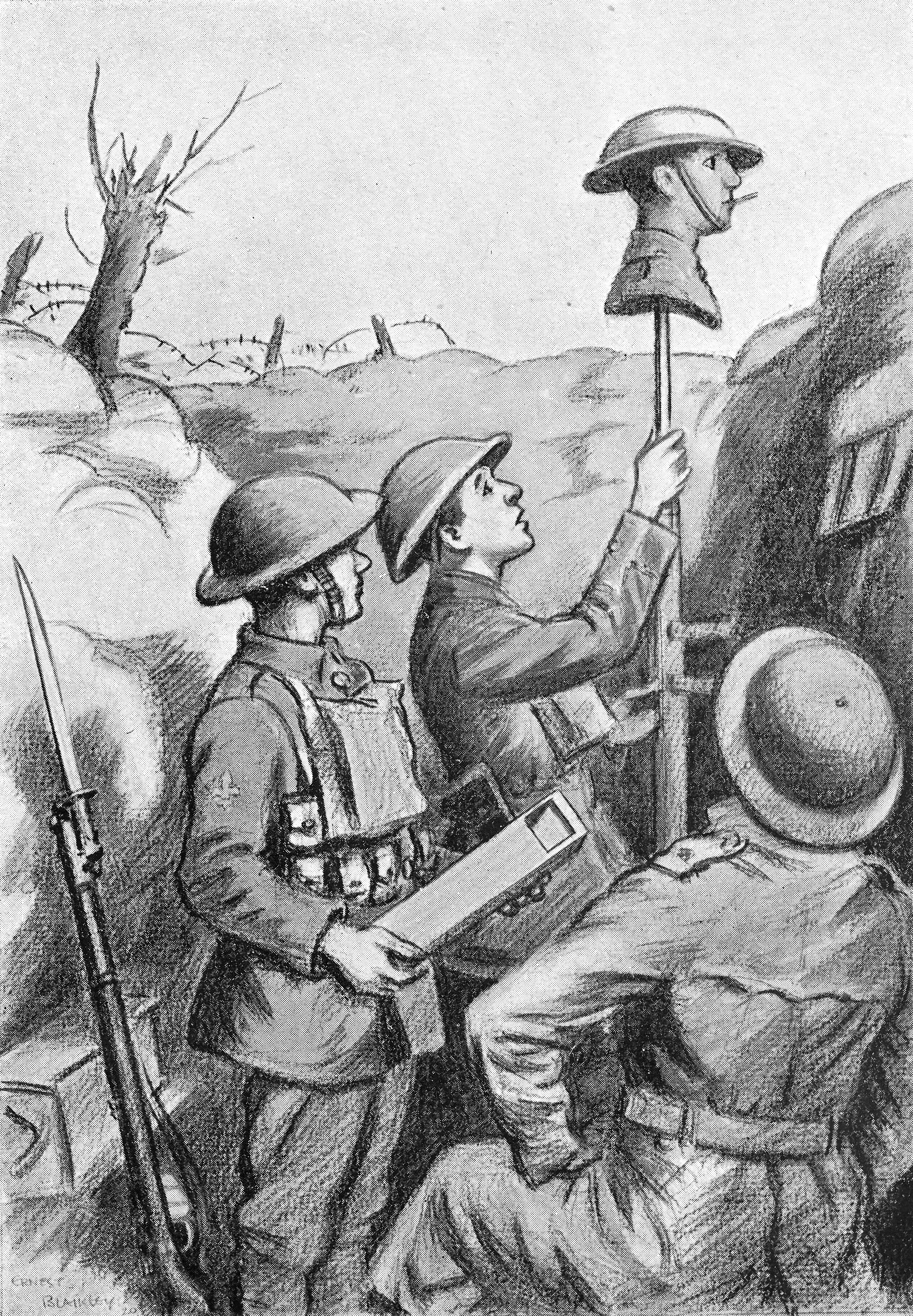
Soldiers raise a Papier-mâché dummy head to locate an enemy sniper

Soon the British army began to train their own snipers in specialized sniper schools. Major Hesketh Hesketh-Prichard was given formal permission to begin sniper training in 1915, and founded the First Army School of Sniping, Observation, and Scouting at Linghem in France in 1916. Starting with a first class of only six, in time he was able to lecture to large numbers of soldiers from different Allied nations, proudly proclaiming in a letter that his school was turning out snipers at three times the rate of any such other school in the world.

He also devised a metal-armoured double loophole that would protect the sniper observer from enemy fire. The front loophole was fixed, but the rear was housed in a metal shutter sliding in grooves. Only when the two loopholes were lined up—a one-to-twenty chance—could an enemy shoot between them. Another innovation was the use of a dummy head to find the location of an enemy sniper. The papier-mâché figures were painted to resemble soldiers to draw sniper fire. Some were equipped with rubber surgical tubing so the dummy could "smoke" a cigarette and thus appear realistic. Holes punched in the dummy by enemy sniper bullets then could be used for triangulation purposes to determine the position of the enemy sniper, who could then be attacked with artillery fire. He developed many of the modern techniques in sniping, including the use of spotting scopes and working in pairs, and using Kim's Game to train observational skills.

In 1920, he wrote his account of his war time activities in his book Sniping in France, to which reference is still made by modern authors regarding the subject.

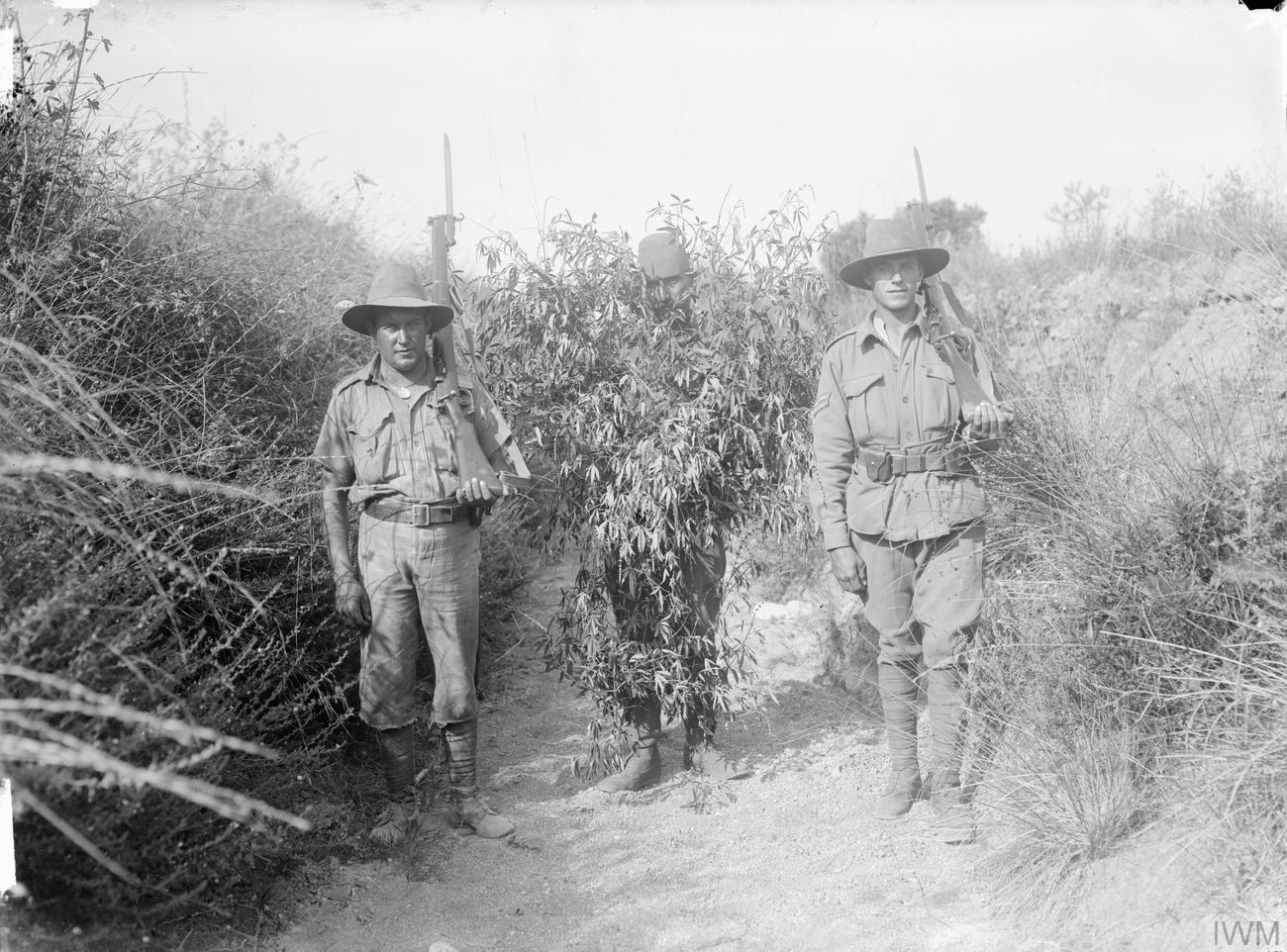
Photograph of a Turkish sniper captured during the Gallipoli campaign.

The main sniper rifles used during the First World War were the German Mauser Gewehr 98; the British Pattern 1914 Enfield and Lee–Enfield SMLE Mk III, the Canadian Ross rifle, the American M1903 Springfield, the Italian M1891 Carcano, and the Russian M1891 Mosin–Nagant.

The Ottoman Empire initiated very effective sniper tactics against the British and ANZAC troops. The Allied forces on the Gallipoli Campaign came to believe that the Ottoman forces employed women snipers as well.

=== World War II ===
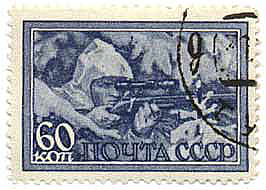
Soviet sniper Lyudmila Pavlichenko on a 1943 stamp

During the interbellum, most nations dropped their specialized sniper units, notably the Germans. Effectiveness and dangers of snipers once again came to the fore during the Spanish Civil War. The only nation that had specially trained sniper units during the 1930s was the Soviet Union. Soviet snipers were trained in their skills as marksmen, in using the terrain to hide themselves from the enemy and the ability to work alongside regular forces. This made the Soviet sniper training focus more on "normal" combat situations than those of other nations.

Snipers reappeared as important factors on the battlefield from the first campaign of World War II. During Germany's 1940 campaigns, lone, well-hidden French and British snipers were able to halt the German advance for a considerable amount of time. For example, during the pursuit to Dunkirk, British snipers were able to significantly delay the German infantry's advance. This prompted the British once again to increase training of specialized sniper units. Apart from marksmanship, British snipers were trained to blend in with the environment, often by using special camouflage clothing for concealment. However, because the British Army offered sniper training exclusively to officers and non-commissioned officers, the resulting small number of trained snipers in combat units considerably reduced their overall effectiveness.

During the Winter War, Finnish snipers inflicted a heavy toll of the invading Red Army. Simo Häyhä is credited with 505 confirmed kills, most with the Finnish version of the iron-sighted bolt-action Mosin–Nagant. The most successful German sniper was Matthäus Hetzenauer with 345 confirmed kills. In Germany, kills are only confirmed in the presence of an officer, so Hetzenauer's estimated kills are many times higher. His longest confirmed kill was reported at 1,100 meters (1,200 yards). Hetzenauer received the Knight's Cross of the Iron Cross on 17 April 1945.

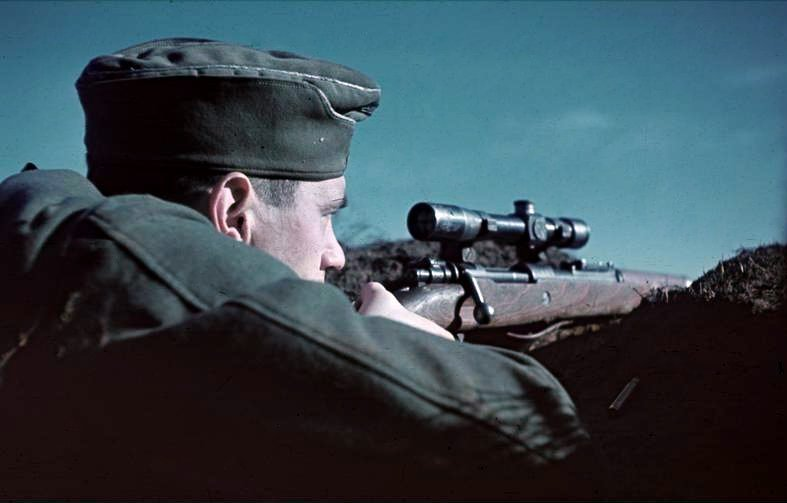
German sniper in Stalingrad, Soviet Union (1942)

One of the best known battles involving snipers, and the battle that made the Germans reinstate their specialized sniper training, was the Battle of Stalingrad. Their defensive position inside a city filled with rubble meant that Soviet snipers were able to inflict significant casualties on the Wehrmacht troops. Because of the nature of fighting in city rubble, snipers were very hard to spot and seriously dented the morale of the German attackers. The best known of these snipers was probably Vasily Zaytsev, featured in the novel War of the Rats and the subsequent film Enemy at the Gates.

German Scharfschützen were prepared before the war, equipped with Karabiner 98 and later Gewehr 43 rifles, but there were often not enough of these weapons available, and as such some were armed with captured scoped Mosin–Nagant 1891/30, SVT, Czech Mauser rifles or scoped Gewehr 98 from WW1. The Wehrmacht re-established its sniper training in 1942, drastically increasing the number of snipers per unit with the creation of an additional 31 sniper training companies by 1944. German snipers were at the time the only snipers in the world issued with purpose-manufactured sniping ammunition, known as the 'effect-firing' sS round. The 'effect-firing' sS round featured an extra carefully measured propellant charge and seated a heavy 12.8 gram (198 gr) full-metal-jacketed boat-tail projectile of match-grade build quality, lacking usual features such as a seating ring to improve the already high ballistic coefficient of .584 (G1) further. For aiming optics German snipers used the Zeiss Zielvier 4x (ZF39) telescopic sight which had bullet drop compensation in 50 m increments for ranges from 100 m up to 800 m or in some variations from 100 m up to 1000 m or 1200 m. There were ZF42, Zielfernrohr 43 (ZF 4), Zeiss Zielsechs 6x, Zeiss Zielacht 8x and other telescopic sights by various manufacturers like the Ajack 4x, Hensoldt Dialytan 4x and Kahles Heliavier 4x with similar features employed on German sniper rifles. Several different mountings produced by various manufacturers were used for mounting aiming optics to the rifles. In February 1945 the Zielgerät 1229 active infrared aiming device was issued for night sniping with the StG 44 assault rifle.

A total of 428,335 individuals received Red Army sniper training, including Soviet and non-Soviet partisans, with 9,534 receiving the sniping 'higher qualification'. During World War ІІ, over 100,000 women went through sniper training, of which more than two thousand later served in the army. Some used the PTRD anti-tank rifle with an adapted scope as an early example of an anti-materiel rifle.

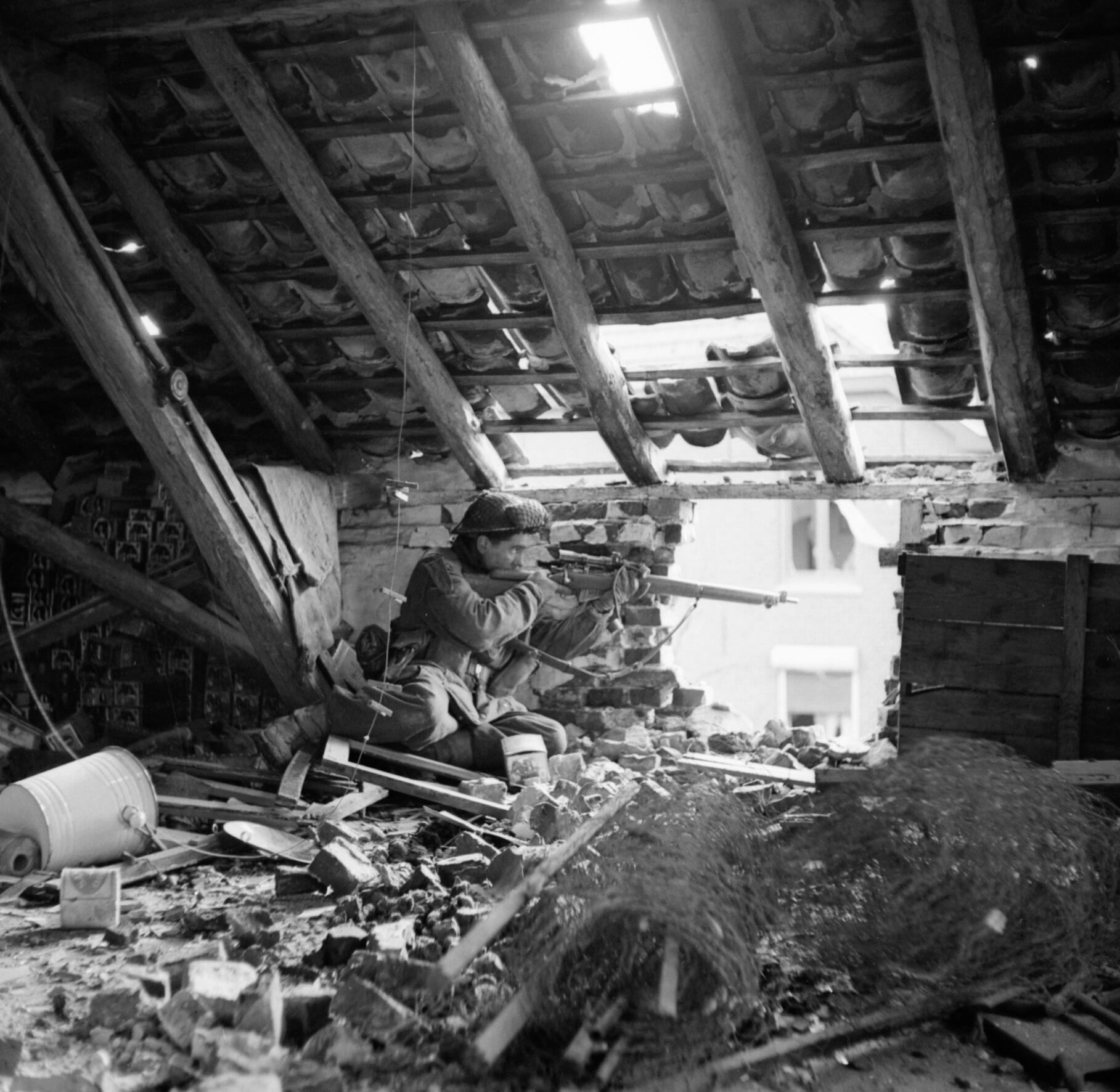
A British sniper in Gennep, Holland, 14 February 1945

In the United States Armed Forces, sniper training was only very elementary and was mainly concerned with being able to hit targets over long distances. Snipers were required to be able to hit a body over 400 meters away, and a head over 200 meters away. There was almost no instruction in blending into the environment. Sniper training varied from place to place, resulting in wide variation in the qualities of snipers. The main reason the US did not extend sniper training beyond long-range shooting was the limited deployment of US soldiers until the Normandy Invasion. During the campaigns in North Africa and Italy, most fighting occurred in arid and mountainous regions where the potential for concealment was limited, in contrast to Western and Central Europe.

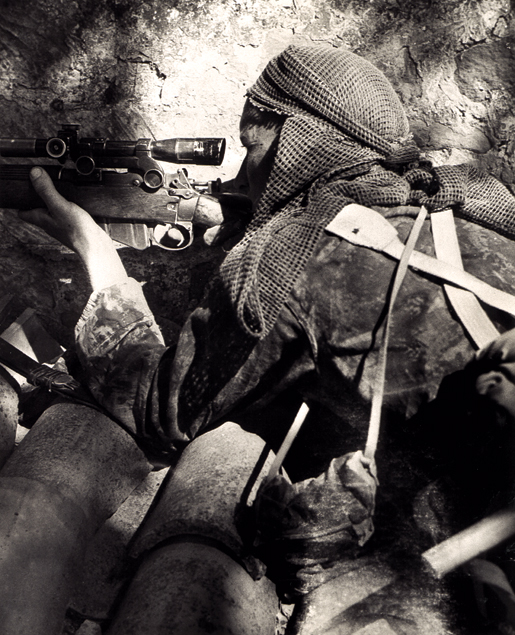
Canadian Sniper during World War II

The U.S. Army's lack of familiarity with sniping tactics proved disastrous in Normandy and the campaign in Western Europe where they encountered well trained German snipers. In Normandy, German snipers could remain hidden in the dense vegetation and were able to encircle American units, firing at them from all sides. The American and British forces were surprised by how near the German snipers could approach in safety and attack them, as well as by their ability to hit targets at up to 1,000m. A notable mistake made by inexperienced American soldiers was to lie down and wait when targeted by German snipers, allowing the snipers to pick them off one after another. German snipers often infiltrated Allied lines, and when the front-lines moved, they would sometimes continue fighting from their sniping positions, refusing to surrender until their rations and munitions were exhausted.

Those tactics were also a consequence of changes in German enlistment. After several years of war and heavy losses on the Eastern Front, the German army was forced to rely more heavily on enlisting teenage soldiers. Due to lack of training in more complex group tactics, and thanks to rifle training provided by the Hitlerjugend, those soldiers were often used as autonomous left-behind snipers. While an experienced sniper would take a few lethal shots and retreat to a safer position, those young boys, due both to a disregard for their own safety and to lack of tactical experience would frequently remain in a concealed position and fight until they ran out of ammunition or were killed or wounded. While this tactic generally ended in the demise of the sniper, giving rise to the nickname "Suicide Boys" that was given to those soldiers, this irrational behavior proved quite disruptive to the Allied forces' progress. After World War II, many elements of German sniper training and doctrine were copied by other countries.

In the Pacific War, the Empire of Japan also trained snipers. In the forests of Asia and the Pacific Islands, snipers posed a serious threat to U.S., British, and Commonwealth troops. Japanese snipers were specially trained to use the environment to conceal themselves, using foliage on their uniforms and digging well-concealed hide-outs that often connected to small trenches. There was no need for long range accuracy because most combat in the forests took place within a few hundred meters. Japanese snipers were known for their patience and ability to remain hidden for long periods, almost never leaving their carefully camouflaged sniping spots. This meant that whenever a sniper was in the area, the location of the sniper could sometimes only be determined after the sniper had fired a few shots. The Allies also used their own snipers in the Pacific, notably the U.S. Marines, who used M1903 Springfield rifles.

Common sniper rifles used during the Second World War include: the Soviet M1891/30 Mosin–Nagant and, to a lesser extent, the SVT-40; the German Mauser Karabiner 98k and Gewehr 43; the British Lee–Enfield No. 4 and Pattern 1914 Enfield; the Japanese Arisaka 97; the American M1903A4 Springfield and M1C Garand. The Italians trained few snipers and supplied them with a scoped Carcano Model 1891.

=== Israeli-Palestinian conflict ===
An unusual aspect of the bitter Israeli-Palestinian conflict is the use of snipers to target children. Israel Defense Forces snipers operating in Gaza have been accused of systematically killing children with single shots to the head or chest.

The intentional shooting of children by Israeli snipers has a long history, for instance as documented in 2019 by an independent international commission of inquiry reporting to the United Nations Human Rights Council. In the West Bank, Israeli security forces have shot children at distances ranging from 300 metres to 20m.

== Law enforcement snipers ==
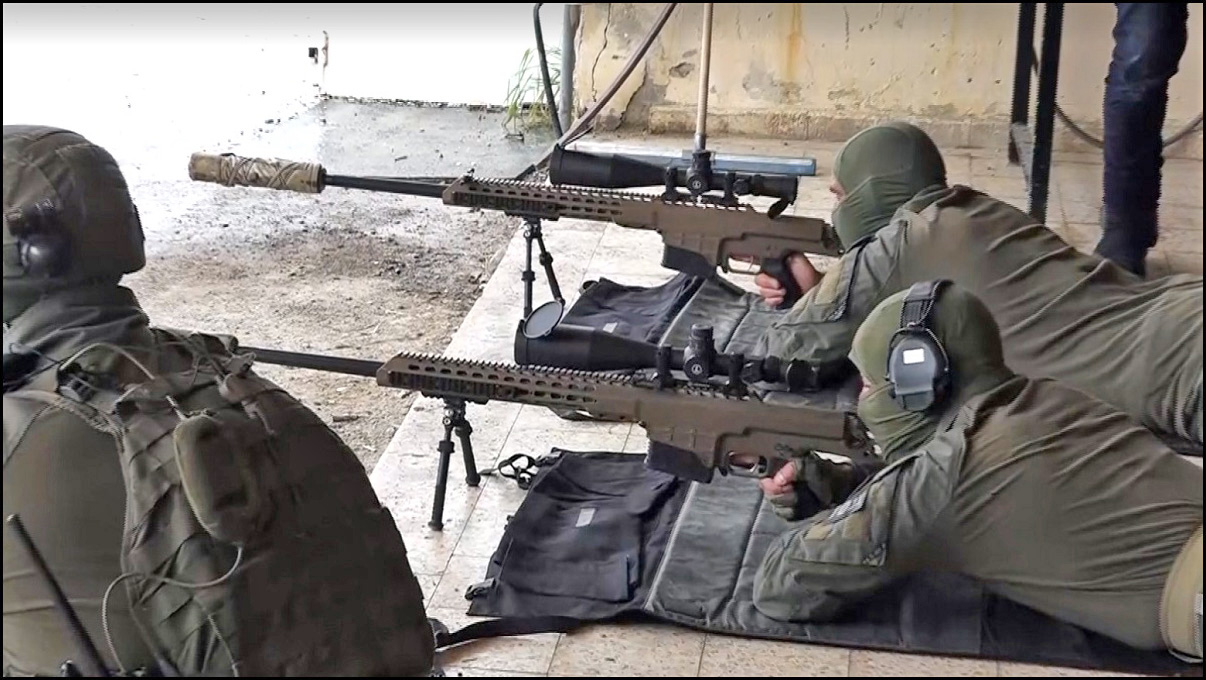
YAMAM (Israel's national counter-terrorism unit) sniper shooting with suppressed Barrett MRAD sniper rifles

Law enforcement snipers, commonly called police snipers, and military snipers differ in many ways, including their areas of operation and tactics. A police sharpshooter is part of a police operation and usually takes part in relatively short missions. Police forces typically deploy such sharpshooters in hostage scenarios. This differs from a military sniper, who operates as part of a larger army, engaged in warfare. Sometimes as part of a SWAT team, police snipers are deployed alongside negotiators and an assault team trained for close quarters combat. As policemen, they are trained to shoot only as a last resort, when there is a direct threat to life; the police sharpshooter has a well-known rule: "Be prepared to take a life to save a life." Police snipers typically operate at much shorter ranges than military snipers, generally under 100 meters (109 yd) and sometimes even less than 50 meters (55 yd). Both types of snipers do make difficult shots under pressure, and often perform one-shot kills.

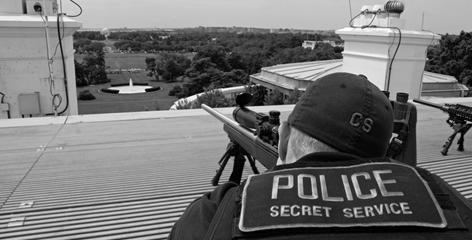
A US Secret Service sniper on the roof of the White House

Police units that are unequipped for tactical operations may rely on a specialized SWAT team, which may have a dedicated sniper. Some police sniper operations begin with military assistance. Police snipers placed in vantage points, such as high buildings, can provide security for events. In one high-profile incident commonly referred to as "The Shot Seen Around the World" due to going viral online, Mike Plumb, a SWAT sniper in Columbus, Ohio, prevented a suicide by shooting a revolver out of the individual's hand, leaving him unharmed.

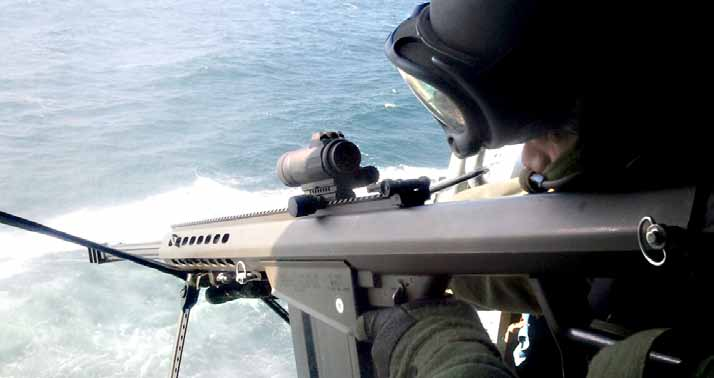
A U.S. Coast Guard TACLET marksman uses an M107 from a helicopter

The need for specialized training for police sharpshooters was made apparent in 1972 during the Munich massacre when the German police could not deploy specialized personnel or equipment during the standoff at the airport in the closing phase of the crisis, and consequently all of the Israeli hostages were killed. While the German army did have snipers in 1972, the use of army snipers in the scenario was impossible due to the German constitution's explicit prohibition of the use of the military in domestic matters. This lack of trained snipers who could be used in civilian roles was later addressed with the founding of the specialized police counter-terrorist unit GSG 9.

== Training ==
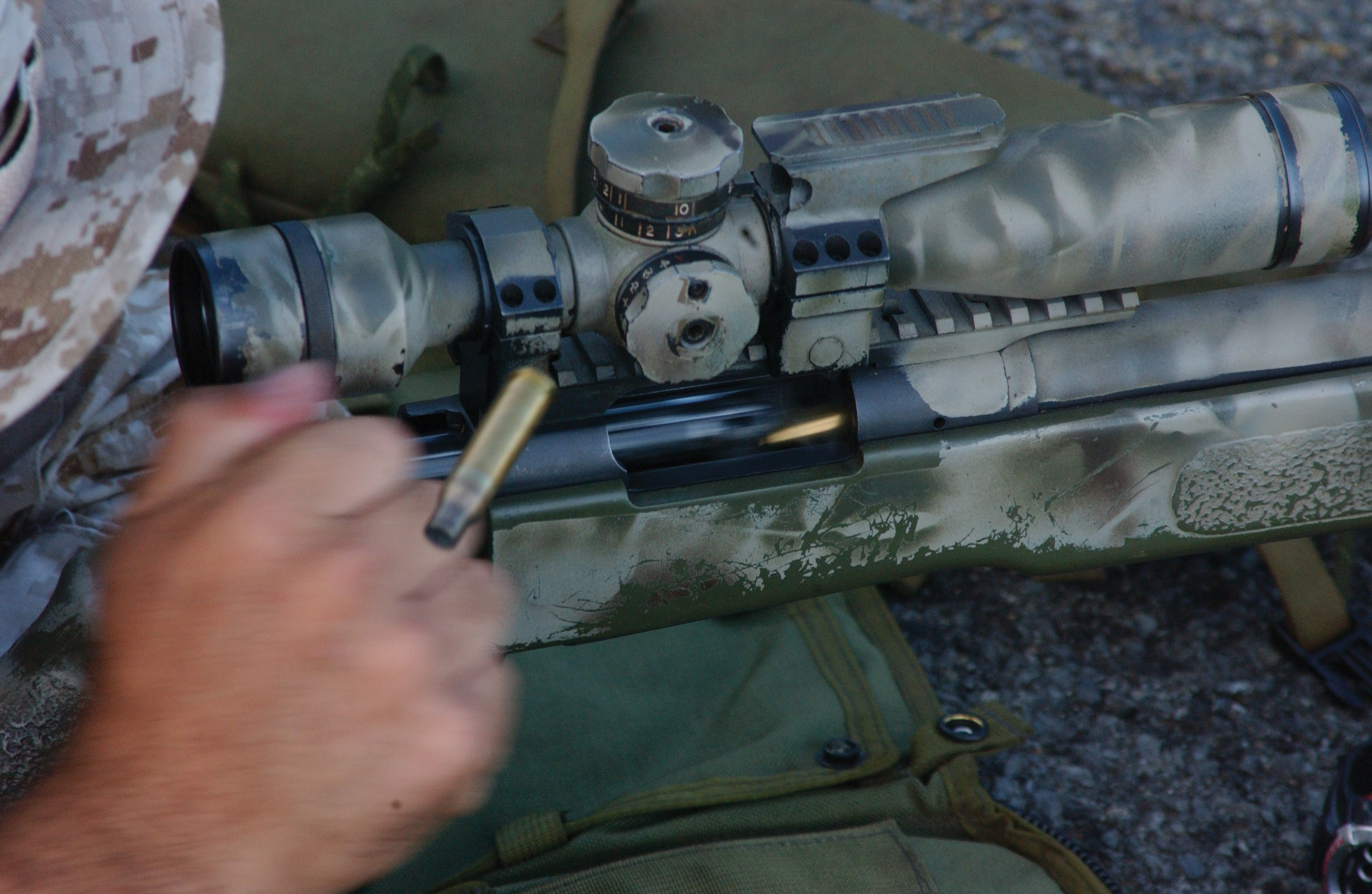
A US Marine extracts a fired cartridge casing and chambers a new round into his M40A3

Military sniper training aims to teach a high degree of proficiency in camouflage and concealment, stalking, observation and map reading as well as precision marksmanship under various operational conditions. Trainees typically shoot thousands of rounds over a number of weeks, while learning these core skills.

Snipers are trained to squeeze the trigger straight back with the ball of their finger, to avoid jerking the gun sideways. The most accurate position is prone, with a sandbag supporting the stock, and the stock's cheek-piece against the cheek. In the field, a bipod can be used instead. Sometimes a sling is wrapped around the weak arm (or both) to reduce stock movement. Some doctrines train a sniper to breathe deeply before shooting, then hold their lungs empty while they line up and take their shot. Other doctrines assert that exhausting the lungs results in an accelerated heart rate and suggest only a partial exhale before firing. Some go further, teaching their snipers to shoot between heartbeats to minimize barrel motion.

=== Accuracy ===
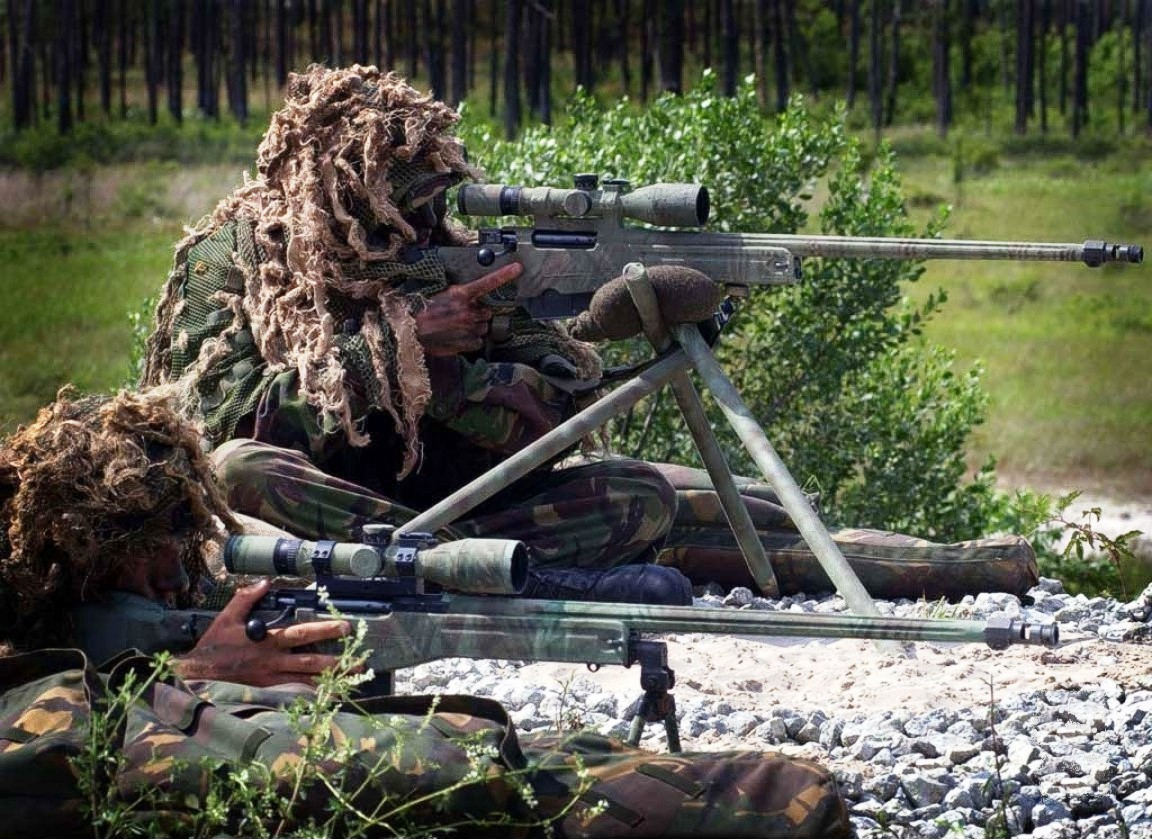
Royal Marines sniper displaying his L115A1 rifle resting on three-legged shooting sticks

Range and accuracy vary depending on the cartridge and specific ammunition types that are used. Typical ranges for common battle field cartridges are as follows:
Cartridge	Maximum effective range (m)
5.56×45mm NATO (.223 Remington)	300–500
7.62×51mm (.308 Winchester)	800–1,000
7.62×54mmR	800–1,000
7 mm Remington Magnum	900–1,100
.300 Winchester Magnum	900–1,200
.338 Lapua Magnum	1,300–1,600
.50 BMG (12.7×99mm NATO)	1,500–2,000
12.7×108mm (Russian)	1,500–2,000
14.5×114mm (Russian)	1,900–2,300
.408 Cheyenne Tactical	1,500–2,400

The key to sniping is considered to be accuracy, which applies to both the weapon and the shooter. The weapon should be able to consistently place shots within tight tolerances. The sniper in turn must use the weapon to accurately place shots under varying conditions.

A sniper must have the ability to accurately estimate the various factors that influence a bullet's trajectory and point of impact, such as range to the target, wind direction, wind velocity, altitude and elevation of the sniper, and the target and ambient temperature. Mistakes in estimation compound over distance and can decrease lethality or cause a shot to miss completely.

Snipers zero their weapons at a target range or in the field. This is the process of adjusting the scope so that the bullets' points-of-impact are at the point-of-aim (centre of scope or scope's cross-hairs) for a specific distance. A rifle and scope should retain its zero as long as possible under all conditions to reduce the need to re-zero during missions.

A sandbag can serve as a useful platform for shooting a sniper rifle, although any soft surface such as a rucksack will steady a rifle and contribute to consistency. In particular, bipods help when firing from a prone position, and enable the firing position to be sustained for an extended period of time. Many police and military sniper rifles come equipped with an adjustable bipod. Makeshift bipods known as shooting sticks can be constructed from items such as tree branches or ski poles.

=== U.S. military ===
Servicemen volunteer for the rigorous sniper training and are accepted on the basis of their aptitude, physical ability, marksmanship, patience and mental stability. Military snipers may be further trained as forward air controllers (FACs) to direct air strikes or forward observers (FOs) to direct artillery or mortar fire.

=== Russian Army ===
From 2011, the Russian armed forces have run newly developed sniper courses in military district training centres. In place of the Soviet practice of mainly squad sharpshooters, which were often designated during initial training (and of whom only few become snipers per se), these new army snipers are trained intensively for three months (for conscripts) or longer (for contract soldiers). The training program includes theory and practice of countersniper engagements, artillery spotting, and coordination of air support. The first instructors are the graduates of the Solnechnogorsk sniper training centre.

The method of sniper deployment, according to the Ministry of Defence, is likely to be one three-platoon company at the brigade level, with one of the platoons acting independently and the other two supporting the battalions as needed.

== Targeting, tactics, and techniques ==
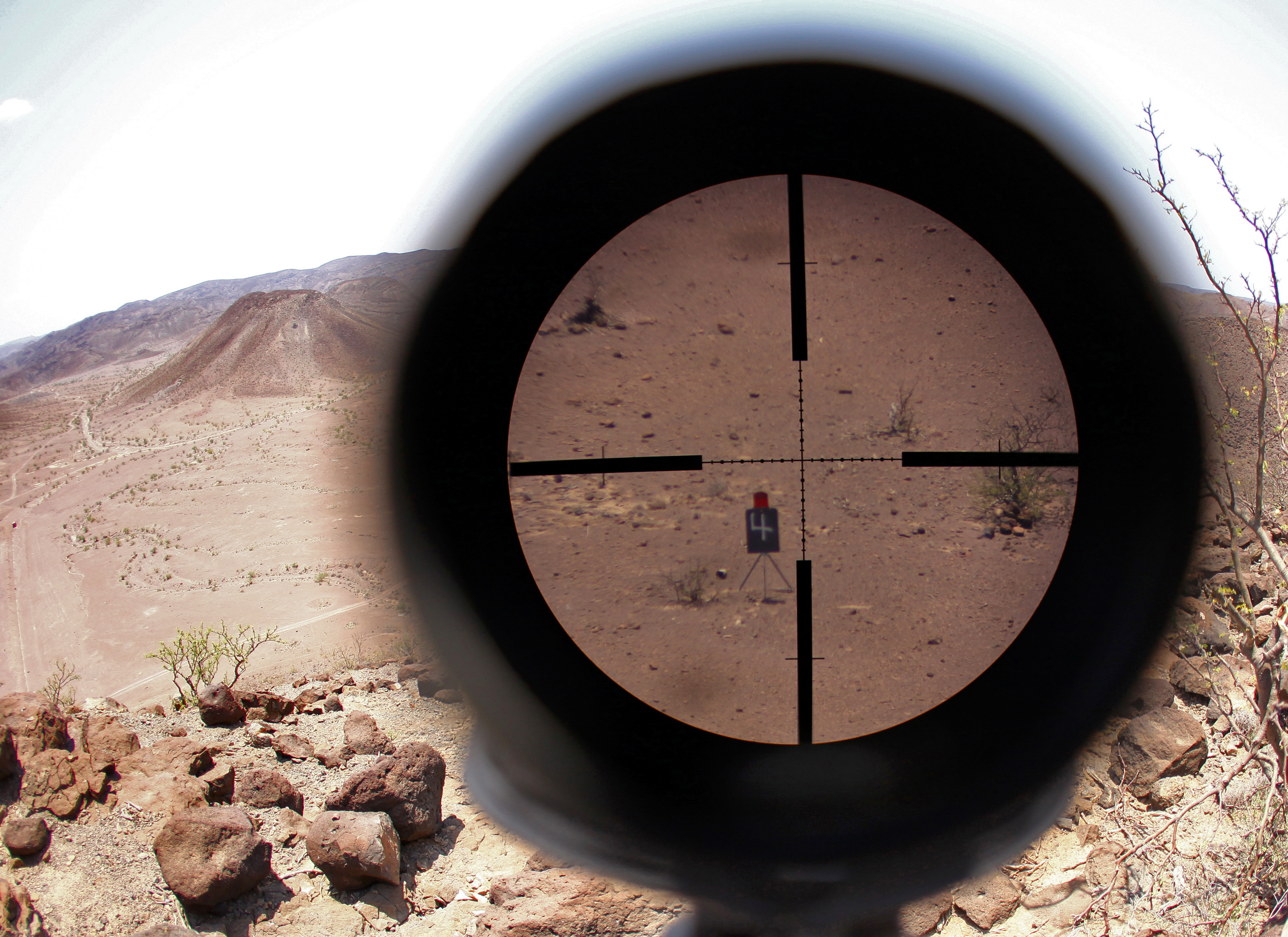
US Marine telescopic sight picture during high-angle marksmanship training

Aerial platform shooting training

=== Range finding ===
The range to the target is measured or estimated as precisely as conditions permit and correct range estimation becomes absolutely critical at long ranges, because a bullet travels with a curved trajectory and the sniper must compensate for this by aiming higher at longer distances. If the exact distance is not known the sniper may compensate incorrectly and the bullet path may be too high or low. As an example, for a typical military sniping cartridge such as 7.62×51mm NATO (.308 Winchester) M118 Special Ball round this difference (or "drop") from 700 to 800 meters (770–870 yd) is 200 millimetres (7.9 in). This means that if the sniper incorrectly estimated the distance as 700 meters when the target was in fact 800 meters away, the bullet will be 200 millimeters lower than expected by the time it reaches the target.

Laser rangefinders may be used, and range estimation is often the job of both parties in a team. One useful method of range finding without a laser rangefinder is comparing the height of the target (or nearby objects) to their size on the mil dot scope, or taking a known distance and using some sort of measure (utility poles, fence posts) to determine the additional distance. The average human head is 150 millimeters (5.9 in) in width, average human shoulders are 500 millimeters (20 in) apart and the average distance from a person's pelvis to the top of their head is 1,000 millimeters (39 in).

To determine the range to a target without a laser rangefinder, the sniper may use the mil dot reticle on a scope to accurately find the range. Mil dots are used like a slide rule to measure the height of a target, and if the height is known, the range can be as well. The height of the target (in yards) ×1000, divided by the height of the target (in mils), gives the range in yards; alternatively in metric the height of the target in centimeters ×10, divided by the height of the target in mils, gives the range in meters. Angular mil (mil) is only an approximation of a milliradian and different organizations use different approximations. This can vary as mil dot sizing and spacing changes. The USMC standard mil dot is sized at .25 mil based on a definition of 1 mil (that is, 1 milliradian) equals 3.438 MOA (minute of arc, or, equivalently, minute of angle) which is typically rounded off to 3.44 MOA for ease of use; this format facilitates estimating a target's height in inches and providing the resulting distance in yards. In comparison, the US Army standard mil dot is sized at .22 (often rounded to .2 for ease of use) mil based on a definition of 1 mil equals 3.6 MOA, which facilitates estimating a target's height in inches and providing the resulting distance in meters.

At longer ranges, bullet drop plays a significant role in targeting. The effect can be estimated from a chart, which may be memorized or taped to the rifle, although some scopes come with Bullet Drop Compensator (BDC) systems that only require the range be dialed in. These are tuned to both a specific class of rifle and specific ammunition. Every bullet type and load will have different ballistics. .308 Federal 175 grain (11.3 g) BTHP match shoots at 2,600 ft/s (790 m/s). Zeroed at 100 yards (100 m), a 16.2 MOA adjustment would have to be made to hit a target at 600 yards (500 m). If the same bullet was shot with 168 grain (10.9 g), a 17.1 MOA adjustment would be necessary.

Shooting uphill or downhill is confusing for many because gravity does not act perpendicular to the direction the bullet is traveling. Thus, gravity must be divided into its component vectors. Only the fraction of gravity equal to the cosine of the angle of fire with respect to the horizon affects the rate of fall of the bullet, with the remainder adding or subtracting negligible velocity to the bullet along its trajectory. To find the correct zero, the sniper multiplies the actual distance to the range by this fraction and aims as if the target were that distance away. For example, a sniper who observes a target 500 meters away at a 45-degree angle downhill would multiply the range by the cosine of 45 degrees, which is 0.707. The resulting distance will be 353 meters. This number is equal to the horizontal distance to the target. All other values, such as windage, time-to-target, impact velocity, and energy will be calculated based on the actual range of 500 meters. Recently, a small device known as a cosine indicator has been developed. This device is clamped to the tubular body of the telescopic sight, and gives an indicative readout in numerical form as the rifle is aimed up or down at the target. This is translated into a figure used to compute the horizontal range to the target.

Windage plays a significant role, with the effect increasing with wind speed or the distance of the shot. The slant of visible convections near the ground can be used to estimate crosswinds, and correct the point of aim. All adjustments for range, wind, and elevation can be performed by aiming off the target, called "holding over" or Kentucky windage. Alternatively, the scope can be adjusted so that the point of aim is changed to compensate for these factors, sometimes referred to as "dialing in". The shooter must remember to return the scope to zeroed position. Adjusting the scope allows for more accurate shots, because the cross-hairs can be aligned with the target more accurately, but the sniper must know exactly what differences the changes will have on the point-of-impact at each target range.

For moving targets, the point-of-aim is ahead of the target in the direction of movement. Known as "leading" the target, the amount of "lead" depends on the speed and angle of the target's movement as well as the distance to the target. For this technique, holding over is the preferred method. Anticipating the behavior of the target is necessary to accurately place the shot.

=== Hide sites and hiding techniques ===
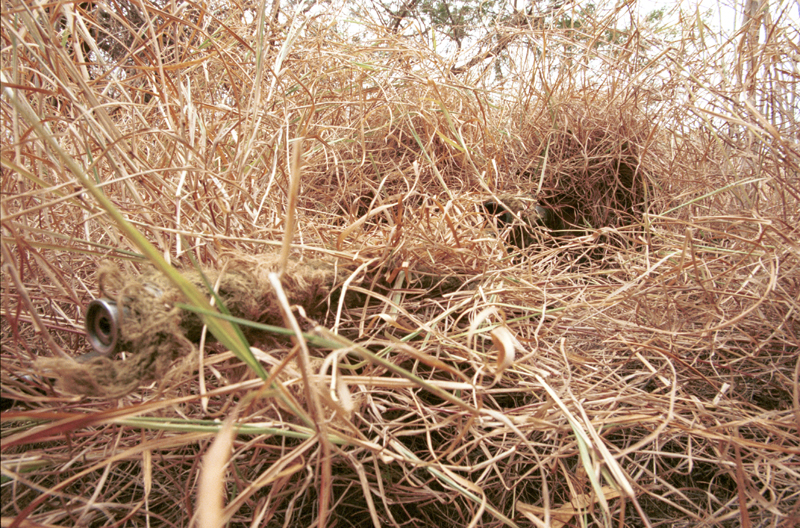
A sniper wearing a ghillie suit to remain hidden in grassland terrain

The term "hide site" refers to a covered and concealed position from which a sniper and his team can conduct surveillance or fire at targets. A good hide conceals and camouflages the sniper effectively, provides cover from enemy fire and allows a wide view of the surrounding area.

The main purpose of ghillie suits and hide sites is to break up the outline of a person with a rifle.

Many snipers use ghillie suits to hide and stay hidden. Ghillie suits vary according to the terrain into which the sniper wishes to blend. For example, in dry grassland the sniper will typically wear a ghillie suit covered in dead grass.

=== Shot placement ===
Shot placement, which is where on the body the sniper is aiming, varies with the type of sniper. Military snipers, who generally do not shoot at targets at less than 300 m (330 yd), usually attempt body shots, aiming at the chest. These shots depend on tissue damage, organ trauma, and blood loss to kill the target. Body shots are used because the chest is a larger target.

Police snipers, who generally shoot at much shorter distances, may attempt a more precise shot at particular parts of body or particular devices: in one incident in 2007 in Marseille, a GIPN sniper took a shot from 80 m (87 yd) at the pistol of a police officer threatening to commit suicide, destroying the weapon and preventing the police officer from killing himself.

In high-risk or hostage situations where a suspect is threatening to imminently kill a hostage, police snipers may take head shots to ensure an instant kill. The snipers aim for the medulla oblongata to sever the spine from the brain. While this is believed to prevent the target from reflexively firing their weapon, there is evidence that any brain-hit is sufficient.

=== Target acquisition ===
Snipers are trained for the detection, identification, and location of a targeted soldier in sufficient detail to permit the effective employment of lethal and non-lethal means. Since most kills in modern warfare are by other crew-served weapons, snipers are often used for reconnaissance They use their aerobic conditioning, infiltration skills and excellent long-distance observation equipment (optical scopes) and tactics to approach and observe the enemy. In this role, their rules of engagement typically let them shoot at high-value targets of opportunity, such as enemy officers.

The targets may be personnel or high-value materiel (military equipment and weapons) but most often they target the most important enemy personnel such as officers or specialists (e.g. communications operators) so as to cause maximum disruption to enemy operations. Other personnel they might target include those who pose an immediate threat to the sniper, like dog handlers, who are often employed in a search for snipers. A sniper identifies officers by their appearance and behavior such as symbols of rank, talking to radio operators, sitting as a passenger in a car, sitting in a car with a large radio antenna, having military servants, binoculars/map cases or talking and moving position more frequently. If possible, snipers shoot in descending order by rank, or if rank is unavailable, they shoot to disrupt communications.

Some rifles, such as the Denel NTW-20 and Vidhwansak, are designed for a purely anti-materiel (AM) role, e.g. shooting turbine disks of parked aircraft, missile guidance packages, expensive optics, and the bearings, tubes or wave guides of radar sets. A sniper equipped with the correct rifle can target radar dishes, water containers, the engines of vehicles, and any number of other targets. Other rifles, such as the .50 caliber rifles produced by Barrett and McMillan, are not designed exclusively as AM rifles, but are often employed in such a way, providing the range and power needed for AM applications in a lightweight package compared to most traditional AM rifles. Other calibers, such as the .408 Cheyenne Tactical and the .338 Lapua Magnum, are designed to be capable of limited AM application, but are ideally suited as long range anti-personnel rounds.

=== Relocating ===
Often in situations with multiple targets, snipers will use relocation. After firing a few shots from a certain position, snipers move unseen to another location before the enemy can determine where they are and mount a counter-attack. Snipers will frequently use this tactic to their advantage, creating an atmosphere of chaos and confusion. In other, rarer situations, relocation is used to eliminate the factor of wind.

=== Sound masking ===
As sniper rifles are often extremely powerful and consequently very loud, it is common for snipers to use a technique known as sound masking. When employed by a highly skilled marksman, this tactic can be used as a substitute for a noise suppressor. In this technique, very loud sounds in the environment, such as artillery shells air bursting or claps of thunder, are used to mask the sound of the shot. This technique is frequently used in clandestine operations, infiltration tactics, and guerrilla warfare.

=== Psychological warfare ===
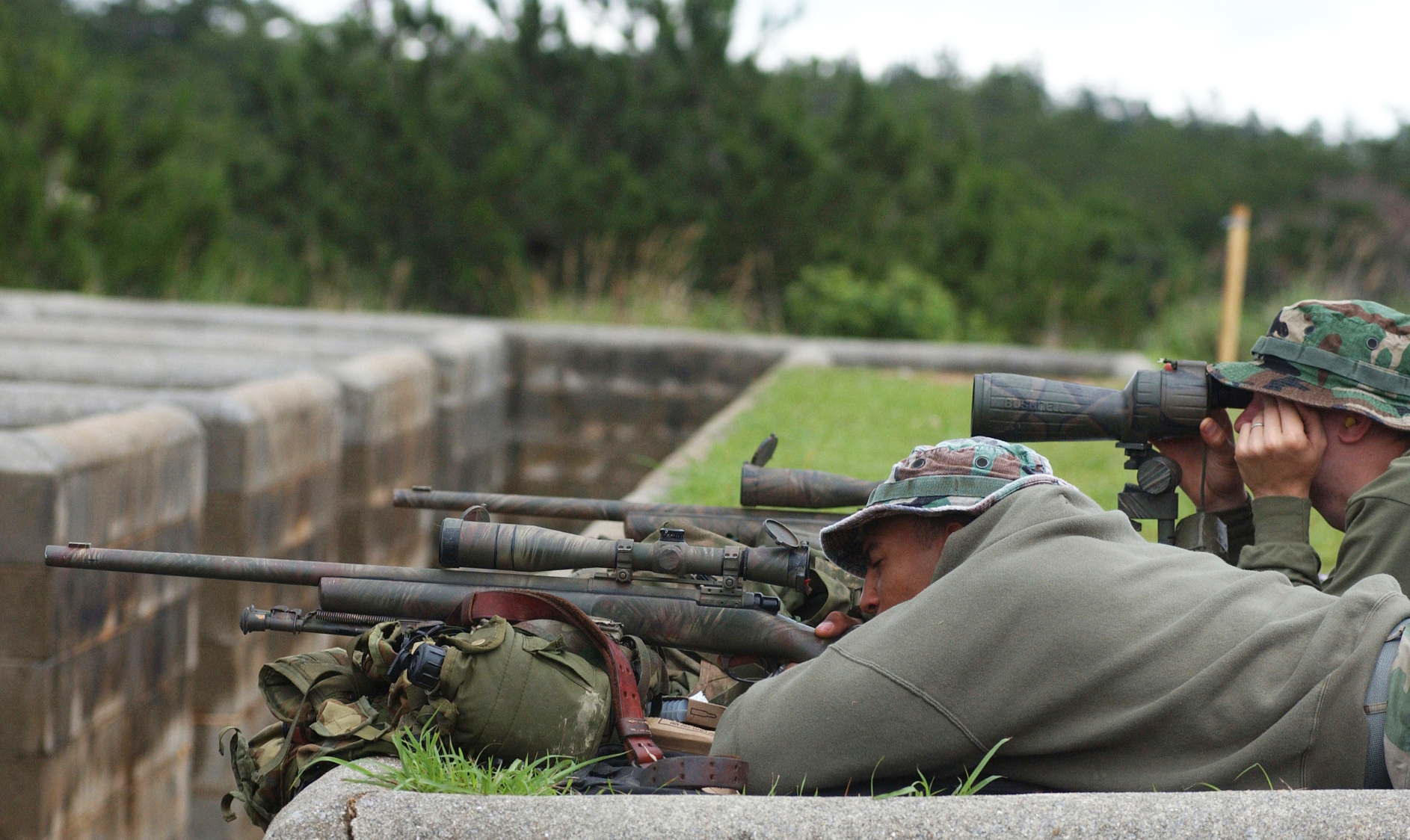
A Special Reaction Team with an M24 Sniper Weapon System in 2004

Due to the surprise nature of sniper fire, high lethality of aimed shots and frustration at the inability to locate and counterattack snipers, sniper tactics have a significant negative effect on morale. Extensive use of sniper tactics can be used to induce constant stress and fear in opposing forces, making them afraid to move about or leave cover. In many ways, the psychological impact imposed by snipers is quite similar to those of landmines, booby-traps, and IEDs (constant threat, high "per event" lethality, inability to strike back).

Historically, captured snipers are often summarily executed. This happened during World War I and World War II; for example, the second Biscari Massacre was when 36 suspected snipers were lined up and executed on 14 July 1943. The risk of captured snipers being summarily executed is explicitly referred to in Chapter 6 of US Army doctrine document FM 3-060.11 entitled "Sniper and Countersniper Tactics, Techniques, and Procedures":

Historically, units that suffered heavy and continual casualties from urban sniper fire and were frustrated by their inability to strike back effectively often have become enraged. Such units may overreact and violate the laws of land warfare concerning the treatment of captured snipers. This tendency is magnified if the unit has been under the intense stress of urban combat for an extended time. It is vital that commanders and leaders at all levels understand the law of land warfare and understand the psychological pressures of urban warfare. It requires strong leadership and great moral strength to prevent soldiers from releasing their anger and frustration on captured snipers or civilians suspected of sniping at them.

The negative reputation and perception of snipers can be traced back to the American Revolution, when American marksmen intentionally targeted British officers, an act considered uncivilized by the British Army at the time. The British side used specially selected sharpshooters as well, often German Hessians.

=== Counter-sniper tactics ===
The occurrence of sniper warfare has led to the evolution of many counter-sniper tactics in modern military strategies. These aim to reduce the damage caused by a sniper to an army, which can often be harmful to both combat capabilities and morale.

The risk of damage to a chain of command can be reduced by removing or concealing features that would otherwise indicate an officer's rank. Modern armies tend to avoid saluting officers in the field, and eliminate rank insignia on battle dress uniforms. Officers can seek cover through mundane actions such as reading maps or using radios.

Friendly snipers can be used to hunt the enemy sniper. Besides direct observation, defending forces can use other techniques. These include calculating the trajectory of a bullet by triangulation. Traditionally, triangulation of a sniper's position was done manually, though radar-based technology recently became available. Once located, the defenders can attempt to approach the sniper from cover and overwhelm them. The United States military is funding a project known as RedOwl (Robot Enhanced Detection Outpost With Lasers), which uses laser and acoustic sensors to determine the exact direction from which a sniper round has been fired.

The more rounds fired by a sniper, the greater the chance the target has of locating him. Thus, attempts to draw fire are often made, sometimes by offering a helmet slightly out of concealment, a tactic successfully employed in the Winter War by the Finns known as "Kylmä-Kalle" (Cold Charlie). They used a shop mannequin or other doll dressed as a tempting target, such as an officer. The doll was then presented as if it were a real man sloppily covering himself. Usually, Soviet snipers were unable to resist the temptation of an apparently easy kill. Once the angle where the bullet came from was determined, a large caliber gun, such as a Lahti L-39 "Norsupyssy" ("Elephant rifle") anti-tank rifle was fired at the sniper to kill him.

Other tactics include directing artillery or mortar fire onto suspected sniper positions, the use of smoke screens, placing tripwire-operated munitions, mines, or other booby-traps near suspected sniper positions. Even dummy trip-wires can be placed to hamper sniper movement. If anti-personnel mines are unavailable, it is possible to improvise booby-traps by connecting trip-wires to hand grenades, smoke grenades or flares. Though these may not kill a sniper, they will reveal their location. Booby-trap devices can be placed near likely sniper hides, or along the probable routes to and from positions. Knowledge of sniper field-craft will assist in this task.

The use of canine units had been very successful, especially during the Vietnam War.

== Irregular and asymmetric warfare ==
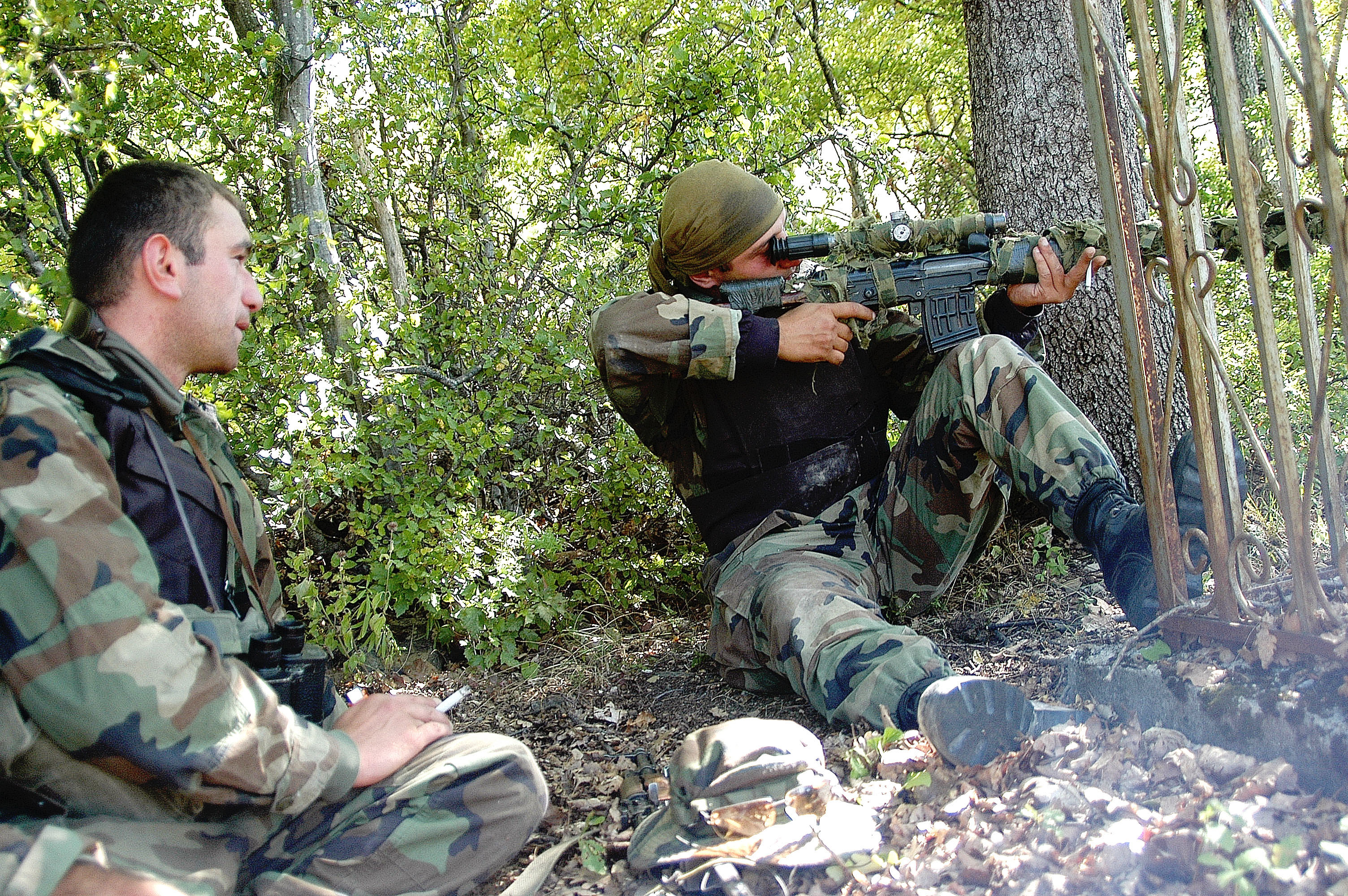
A Georgian sniper in the Georgian-Ossetian conflict (2004)

The use of sniping (in the sense of shooting at relatively long range from a concealed position) to murder came to public attention in a number of sensational U.S. criminal cases, including the Austin sniper incident of 1966 (Charles Whitman), the John F. Kennedy assassination (Lee Harvey Oswald), and the Beltway sniper attacks of late 2002 (Lee Boyd Malvo). However, these incidents usually do not involve the range or skill of military snipers; in all three cases the perpetrators had U.S. military training, but in other specialties. News reports will often (inaccurately) use the term sniper to describe anyone shooting with a rifle at another person.

Sniping has been used in asymmetric warfare situations, for example in the Northern Ireland Troubles, where in 1972, the bloodiest year of the conflict, the majority of the soldiers killed were shot by concealed IRA riflemen. There were some instances in the early 1990s of British soldiers and RUC personnel being shot with .50 caliber Barrett rifles by sniper teams collectively known as the South Armagh sniper.

The sniper is particularly suited to combat environments where one side is at a disadvantage. A careful sniping strategy can use a few individuals and resources to thwart the movement or other progress of a much better equipped or larger force. Sniping enables a few persons to instil terror in a much larger regular force – regardless of the size of the force the snipers are attached to. It is widely accepted that sniping, while effective in specific instances, is much more effective as a broadly deployed psychological attack or as a force-multiplier.

=== War in Iraq ===
In 2003, the U.S.-led multinational coalition composed of primarily U.S. and UK troops occupied Iraq and attempted to establish a new government in the country. However, shortly after the initial invasion, violence against coalition forces and among various sectarian groups led to asymmetric warfare with the Iraqi insurgency and civil war between many Sunni and Shia Iraqis.

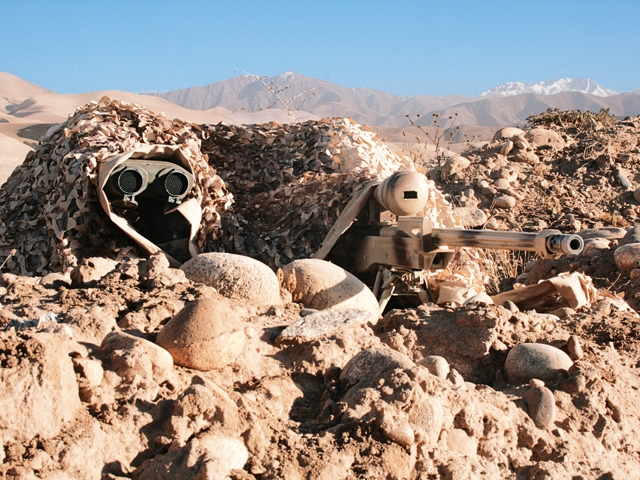
Bundeswehr sniper team in position, Kunduz Province, Afghanistan

Through to November 2005 the Army had attributed 28 of 2,100 U.S. deaths to enemy snipers. In 2006, it was claimed that one insurgent sniper, "Juba", had shot up to 37 American soldiers.

Training materials obtained by U.S. intelligence had among its tips for shooting U.S. troops, "Killing doctors and chaplains is suggested as a means of psychological warfare.", suggesting that those casualties would demoralize entire units.

=== Arab Spring ===
Sniper activity was reported during the Arab Spring civil unrest in Libya in 2011, both from anti-governmental and pro-governmental supporters, and in Syria at least from pro-government forces.

== Notable military marksmen and snipers ==
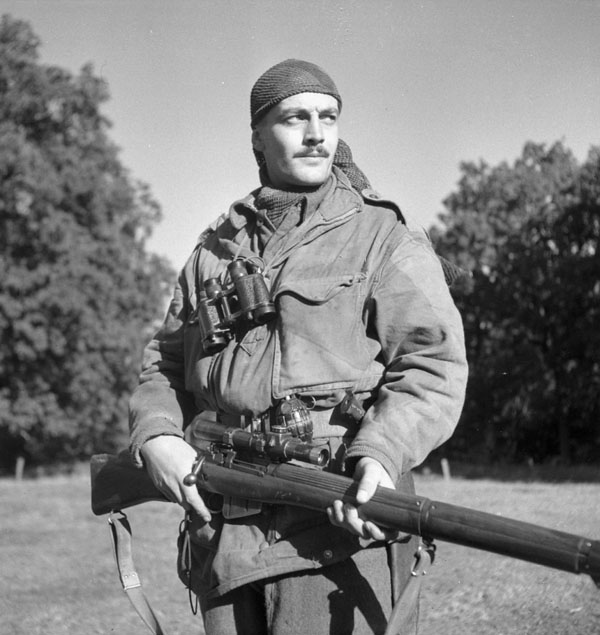
Sergeant H.A. Marshall of The Calgary Highlanders. Canadian snipers in the Second World War were trained scouts. Specialized equipment includes Lee–Enfield No. 4 Mk I(T) rifle and scope combination and a camouflaged Denison smock. PAC Photo, by Ken Bell (September 1944).

Even before firearms were available, soldiers such as archers were specially trained as elite marksmen.

=== 17th century ===
- Lord Brooke, who represented the Parliamentarians in the English Civil War, was the first recorded British sniper victim, killed by a Royalist soldier hiding in a bell tower in Lichfield.

=== 18th century ===
- Timothy Murphy (American Revolutionary War) – killed British General Simon Fraser during the pivotal Battles of Saratoga, hampering the British advance which resulted in their defeat.

=== 19th century ===
- Napoleonic Wars – Use of Marine sharpshooters in mast tops was common in navies of the period, and Admiral Nelson's death at Trafalgar is attributed to the actions of French sharpshooters. The British Army developed the concept of directed fire (as opposed to massive unaimed volleys) and formed Rifle regiments, notably the 95th and the 60th who wore green jackets instead of the usual redcoats. Fighting as Skirmishers, usually in pairs, and trusted to choose their own targets, they wrought havoc amongst the French during the Peninsular War.
- British Rifleman Thomas Plunkett (Peninsular War) – shot French General Colbert and one of his aides at a range of between 200 and 600 metres (219 and 656 yd) using a Baker rifle.
- Colonel Hiram Berdan (American Civil War) – commanded 1st and 2nd US Sharpshooters, who were Union marksmen trained and equipped with the .52 caliber Sharps Rifle. It has been claimed that Berdan's units killed more enemies than any other in the Union Army.
- Jack Hinson (American Civil War) recorded 36 "kills" on his custom-made .50 caliber Kentucky long rifle with iron sights.
- During the American Civil War, an unidentified Confederate sniper shot Major General John Sedgwick during the Battle of Spotsylvania Court House probably with a British Whitworth target rifle at the then-incredible distance of minimum 730 metres (798 yd). Ben Powell of the 12th South Carolina claimed credit, although his account has been discounted because the general he shot at with a Whitworth rifled musket was mounted, probably Brig Gen. William H. Morris. Union troops from the 6th Vermont claim to have shot an unidentified sharpshooter as they crossed the fields seeking revenge. The shooting of Sedgewick caused administrative delays in the Union's attack and led to Confederate victory. Sedgwick ignored advice to take cover, his last words according to urban legend being, "They couldn't hit an elephant at this dist-", whereupon he was shot. In reality, he was shot a few minutes later.
- Major Frederick Russell Burnham – assassinated Mlimo, the Ndebele religious leader, in his cave in Matobo Hills, Rhodesia, effectively ending the Second Matabele War (1896). Burnham started as a cowboy and Indian tracker in the American Old West, but he left the United States to scout in Africa and went on to command the British Army Scouts in the Second Boer War. For his ability to track, even at night, the Africans dubbed him, He-who-sees-in-the-dark, but in the press he became more widely known as England's American Scout.

=== 20th century ===
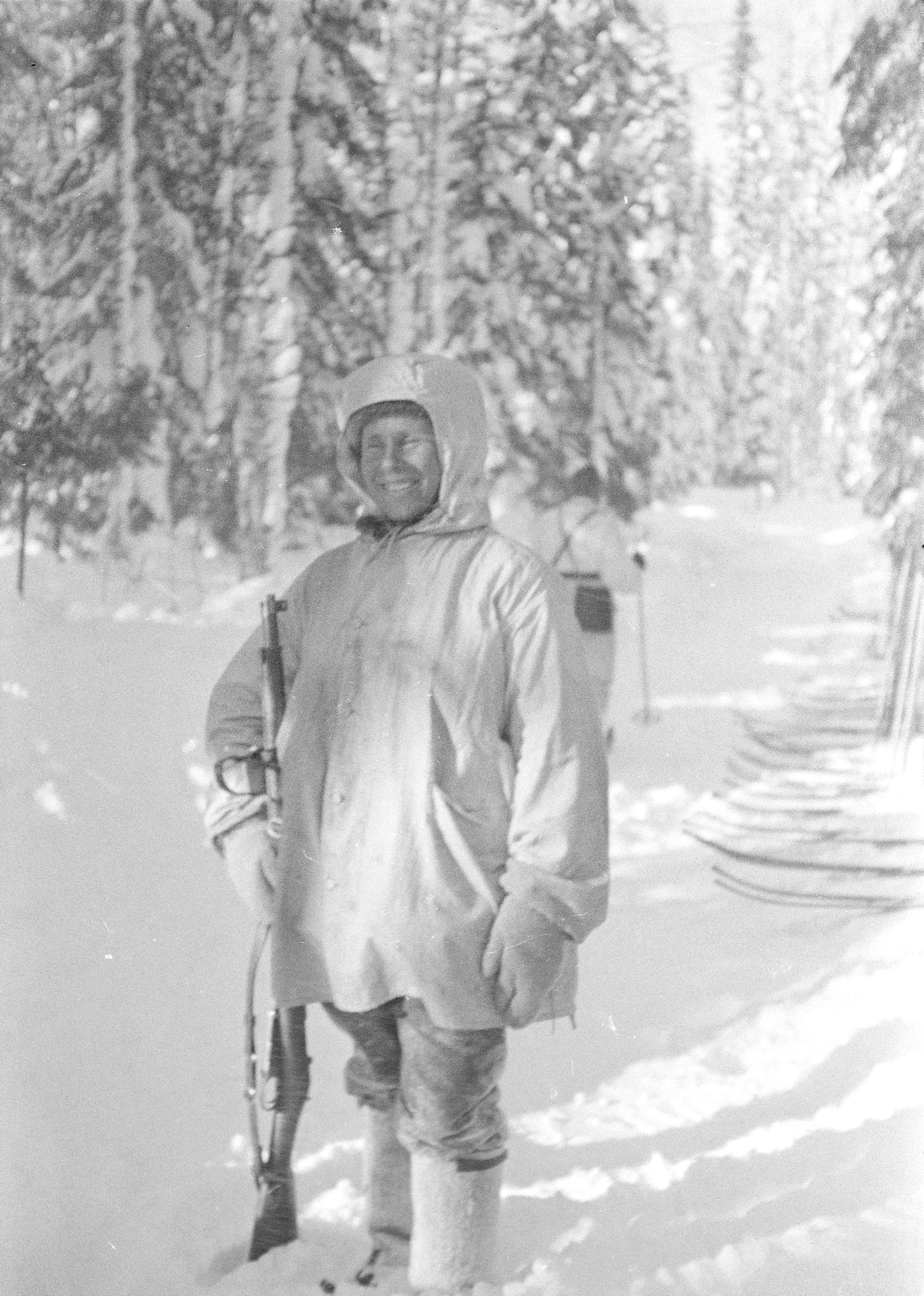
Simo Häyhä, known among enemies by the nickname "White Death", is generally recognized as the world's deadliest military sniper of all time.

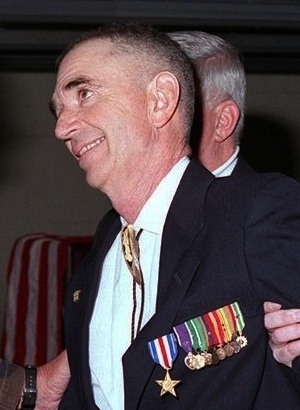
Carlos Hathcock, nicknamed "White Feather" by the North Vietnamese Army (NVA), was a United States Marine Corps sniper with a service record of 93 confirmed kills.

- Billy Sing (World War I) – An Australian sniper with at least 150 confirmed kills during the Gallipoli Campaign; he may have had close to 300 kills in total at Gallipoli, and went on to fight at the Western Front.
- Francis Pegahmagabow (World War I) – Native Canadian sniper credited with 378 kills, and an unknown number of unconfirmed kills. He only took credit for kills when they were verified by an officer.
- Finnish Lance Corporal Simo Häyhä, nicknamed "White Death", was a sniper during the Winter War and is regarded by many as the most effective sniper in the history of warfare, being credited with killing up to 705 Soviet soldiers (505 sniper kills, and estimated 200 sub-machine gun kills) in fewer than 100 days. Häyhä used a White Guard M/28 "Pystykorva" or "Spitz", variant of the Russian Mosin–Nagant rifle.
- Mikhail Ilyich Surkov has been said to have killed 702 enemy troops, Vladimir Gavrilovich Salbiev had 601 confirmed kills, Vasilij Kvachantiradze had 534, Akhat Akhmetyanov and Ivan Sidorenko had around 500.
- Lieutenant Lyudmila Pavlichenko (World War II) was a female Soviet sniper with 309 confirmed kills, making her the most successful female sniper in history.
- Junior Lieutenant Vasily Zaytsev (World War II) was credited with killing about 200 German soldiers during the Battle of Stalingrad; he is portrayed in the film Enemy at the Gates and in the book War of the Rats. Both are fictionalized accounts.
- Gefreiter (Private) Matthäus Hetzenauer of the 3rd Mountain Division (German: 3. Gebirgs-Division) was an Austrian sniper in World War II who was credited with 345 confirmed kills on the Eastern Front, the most successful in the Wehrmacht.
- Helmut Wirnsberger – Austrian sniper, who has served in 3. Gebirgs-Division during WW II and credited 64 confirmed kills.
- Zhang Taofang (Chinese: 张桃芳; Traditional Chinese: 張桃芳; Wade–Giles: Zhang Tao-fang) was a Chinese soldier during the Korean War. He is credited with 214 confirmed kills in 32 days without using a sniper magnifying scope.
- Clive Hulme was a New Zealand recipient of the Victoria Cross, the highest and most prestigious award for gallantry in the face of the enemy that can be awarded to British and Commonwealth forces. He is credited with stalking and killing 33 German snipers in the Battle of Crete.
- Ian Robertson served as a sniper with Australia's 3RAR after World War II. He became one of the most effective snipers during the Korean War, during which in one instance he killed 30 soldiers in a single morning.
- Roza Shanina was a Soviet sniper during World War II credited with 59 confirmed kills, including twelve soldiers during the Battle of Vilnius.
- Gunnery Sergeant Carlos Hathcock achieved 93 confirmed kills during the Vietnam War but believed to have over 200 unconfirmed kills. With a telescopic-scoped .50 caliber M2 Browning heavy machine gun, he set a world record for the longest recorded sniper kill at 2,286 m (2,500 yd) which stood for 35 years until 2002.
- Chuck Mawhinney (Vietnam War) – 103 confirmed and 216 probable kills.
- Adelbert Waldron (Vietnam War) – achieved 109 confirmed kills.
- Master Sgt. Gary Gordon and Sgt. First Class Randy Shughart (Somalia: Operation Gothic Serpent) – were Delta Force snipers who were awarded the Medal of Honor for their attempt to protect the injured crew of a downed helicopter during the Battle of Mogadishu. This action was later dramatized in the film Black Hawk Down.

=== 21st century ===
- British Army CoH Craig Harrison of the Household Cavalry successfully killed two Taliban machine gunners south of Musa Qala in Helmand Province in Afghanistan in November 2009 at a range of 2,475 m (2,707 yd), using an L115A3 Long Range Rifle rifle chambered in .338 Lapua Magnum. These were the longest recorded and confirmed sniper kills to that time.
- Canadian Master Corporal Arron Perry, formerly of the PPCLI (Operation Anaconda, Afghanistan) – briefly held the record for the longest recorded and confirmed sniper kill at 2,310 m (2,526 yd) in 2002, eclipsing U.S. Marine Gunnery Sergeant Carlos Hathcock's previous record established in 1967. Perry used a .50 caliber (12.7 mm) McMillan TAC-50 rifle. A few days later, a new record was achieved by his teammate during the same operation.
- Canadian Corporal Rob Furlong, formerly of the PPCLI (Operation Anaconda, Afghanistan) – achieved a recorded and confirmed sniper kill at 2,430 m (2,657 yd) in 2002 using a .50 caliber (12.7 mm) McMillan TAC-50 rifle.
- U.S. Navy Chief Chris Kyle of SEAL Team Three, during four deployments to Iraq between 2003 and 2009, had 255 kills, 160 of which are confirmed by the United States Department of Defense, making him the deadliest marksman in US military history. During the Second Battle of Fallujah alone, when U.S. Marines fought running battles in the streets with several thousand insurgents, he killed 40 enemy personnel. For his deadly record as a marksman during his deployment to Ramadi, the insurgents named him 'Al-Shaitan Ramad' – the Devil of Rahmadi – and put a $20,000 bounty on his head. Kyle was honorably discharged in 2009, and on 2 February 2013, was murdered at a shooting range along with another victim in Texas by a Marine veteran suffering from post traumatic stress disorder. Subject of the movie American Sniper.
- Canadian Master Corporal Graham Ragsdale, using a 7.62mm C-3, registered 20 confirmed kills over ten days during Operation Anaconda.
- Iraqi insurgent "Juba", a sniper who features in several propaganda videos. Juba has allegedly shot 37 American soldiers, although whether Juba is a real individual is unknown. He may be a constructed composite of a number of insurgent snipers.
- Corporal Ben Roberts-Smith VC MG of the Australian Special Air Service Regiment was awarded the Medal of Gallantry for his actions in 2006 during Operation Perth in the Chora Valley of Oruzgan Province, Afghanistan. In that action, patrol sniper Roberts-Smith prevented an outnumbered patrol from being overrun by anti-coalition militia with sniper fire. Subsequently, in early 2011, he became the second Australian to be awarded the Victoria Cross on Operation Slipper in Afghanistan. During the Shah Wali Kot Offensive in June 2010, having provided sniper over-watch for ground forces from a helicopter with an M14 EBR rifle, Roberts-Smith was placed into a firefight by helicopter and subsequently eliminated machine gun positions.

== See also ==
- Marksman
- Exhibition shooting
- Jäger (infantry)
- List of snipers
- List of sniper rifles
- Longest recorded sniper kills
- Operation Foxley – plan to kill Adolf Hitler using a sniper
- Sniper Alley
- Snipers of the Soviet Union
- South Armagh Sniper (1990–97)
- Special forces
- Sniper equipment
- D.C. sniper attacks
