= Akhat Akhmetyanov =

Soviet WWII sniper

- Әхәт Әбделхаҡ улы Әхмәтйәнов
- Born: 10 August 1918
- Died: 3 August 1976 (aged 57)
- Military career
- Allegiance: Soviet Union
- Branch: Red Army
- Service years: 1938–1944
- Rank: Senior sergeant
- Conflicts: World War II; Winter War; Eastern Front
- Awards: Order of the Patriotic War; Order of the Red Star

Akhat Abdulkhakovich Akhmetyanov (Russian: Ахат Абдулхакович Ахметьянов, Bashkir: Әхәт Әбделхаҡ улы Әхмәтйәнов; 10 August 1918 — 3 August 1976) was one of the top snipers in the Red Army during World War II.

== Prewar ==
Akhmetyanov was born on 10 August 1918 to a Bashkir family in Makarovo. He completed seven grades of school and then graduated from the Sermenevsky Pedagogical School in 1936 before working at a math teacher. He began to study at the Odessa Institute of Chemical Technology before entering the Red Army in 1938. He fought in the Winter War before being demobilized, but he was redrafted into the army a week before the German invasion of the Soviet Union.

== World War II ==
In the early days of the war he was in a training battalion in Khlebnikovo. He first saw battle in July near Moscow, as part of the 166th Special Rifle Battalion. He was shell shocked on 5 August 1941 and was sent to Boksitogorsk before being moved to the 549th Special Rifle Battalion. He was wounded for the first time in January 1942 and moved to the Leningrad Front in August 1942 as part of the 260th Rifle Regiment. There he trained 25 new snipers and personally killed 83 enemy soldiers, for which he was awarded the Order of the Red Star on 11 November. On 26 September 1943 he was awarded the Order of the Patriotic War 2nd class for killing 359 Nazis and training 106 new snipers. He was visited by Ilya Ehrenburg who praised his sniper skills, and on 15 January 1944 he was awarded the Excellent Sniper badge. He was discharged from the military as an invalid after being badly wounded in the stomach in February 1944. His exact tally varies between sources. There is no final award sheet specifying a breakdown of his kills, but a quote from him in the newspaper Na Strazhe Rodiny on 31 December 1943 claimed a tally of 502 kills, and in his postwar autobiography he said he killed 567 fascists, although it was not specified how many were sniper kills and how many of them were from other means such as grenades and machine gun fire.

== Civilian life ==
After being discharged from the military he returned to working as a schoolteacher in his home village, becoming the director of the school and the head of the local department of education. He worked as the director of three other schools before he died on 3 August 1976. A Veterans Council petitioned the government for him to be awarded the title Hero of the Soviet Union, but it was not awarded for unknown reasons. There is a memorial plaque on the home where he lived.
