= Khlebnikovo =

Khlebnikovo (Russian: Хле́бниково) is the name of several rural localities in Russia:

- Khlebnikovo, Mari El Republic, a selo in Mari-Tureksky District of the Mari El Republic
- Khlebnikovo, Tambov Oblast, a selo in Sosnovsky District of Tambov Oblast
- Khlebnikovo, Vologda Oblast, a village in Gryazovetsky District of Vologda Oblast
