= Khlebnikovo, Vologda Oblast =

Khlebnikovo Хлебниково
- Village
- Location within Vologda Oblast Location within Russia
- Coordinates: 58°48′N 40°49′E
- Country: Russia
- Region: Vologda Oblast
- District: Gryazovetsky District
- Time zone: UTC+3:00

Khlebnikovo (Russian: Хлебниково) is a rural locality (a village) in Sidorovskoye Rural Settlement, Gryazovetsky District, Vologda Oblast, Russia. The population was 7 as of 2002.

== Geography ==
Khlebnikovo is located 40 km (25 mi) southeast of Gryazovets (the district's administrative centre) by road. Baklanka is the nearest rural locality.
