= Helmut Wirnsberger =

Helmut Wirnsberger (born in Steyr) was an Austrian sniper in the 3rd Mountain Division on the Eastern Front of the Second World War, and was credited with 64 kills.

Wirnsberger was sent to the Eastern Front in September 1942, and fought with both a K-98 and a Gewehr 43 after sniper training in the Seetaler Alpen.

After being wounded, Wirnsberger was reassigned to teach courses on sniper training.
