= Scientific jury selection =

Use of social science techniques to choose favorable juries

Scientific jury selection, often abbreviated SJS, is the use of social science techniques and expertise to choose favorable juries during a criminal or civil trial. Scientific jury selection is used during the jury selection phase of the trial, during which lawyers have the opportunity to question jurors. It almost always entails an expert's assistance in the attorney's use of peremptory challenges—the right to reject a certain number of potential jurors without stating a reason—during jury selection. The practice is currently unique to the American legal system.

Scientific jury selection is based on the work of Fred Strodtbeck, the research director on the American Juries Project headed by Harry Kalvin, Jr and Hans Zeisel. He taped mock juries in Chicago and St. Louis and actual juries in Wichita, Kansas with the permission of the attorneys and judge but not the jurors. The study revealed that the characteristics of individual jurors influenced jury deliberations.

SJS has roots in criminal trials during the Vietnam War era, but in modern times is usually employed in high-stakes civil litigation (where only money is usually at issue, in contrast to criminal trials, where the defendant can go to prison). SJS practitioners determine what background characteristics and attitudes predict favorable results, and then coordinate with attorneys in choosing the jury. Studies are mixed as to the effectiveness of the practice, though it is clear that the evidence presented at trial is the most important determiner of verdicts (the trial result) and that SJS is more likely to have an impact where that evidence is ambiguous. SJS's potential to unfairly skew the jury has led to some reform proposals, but none have yet been implemented.

== History and use ==
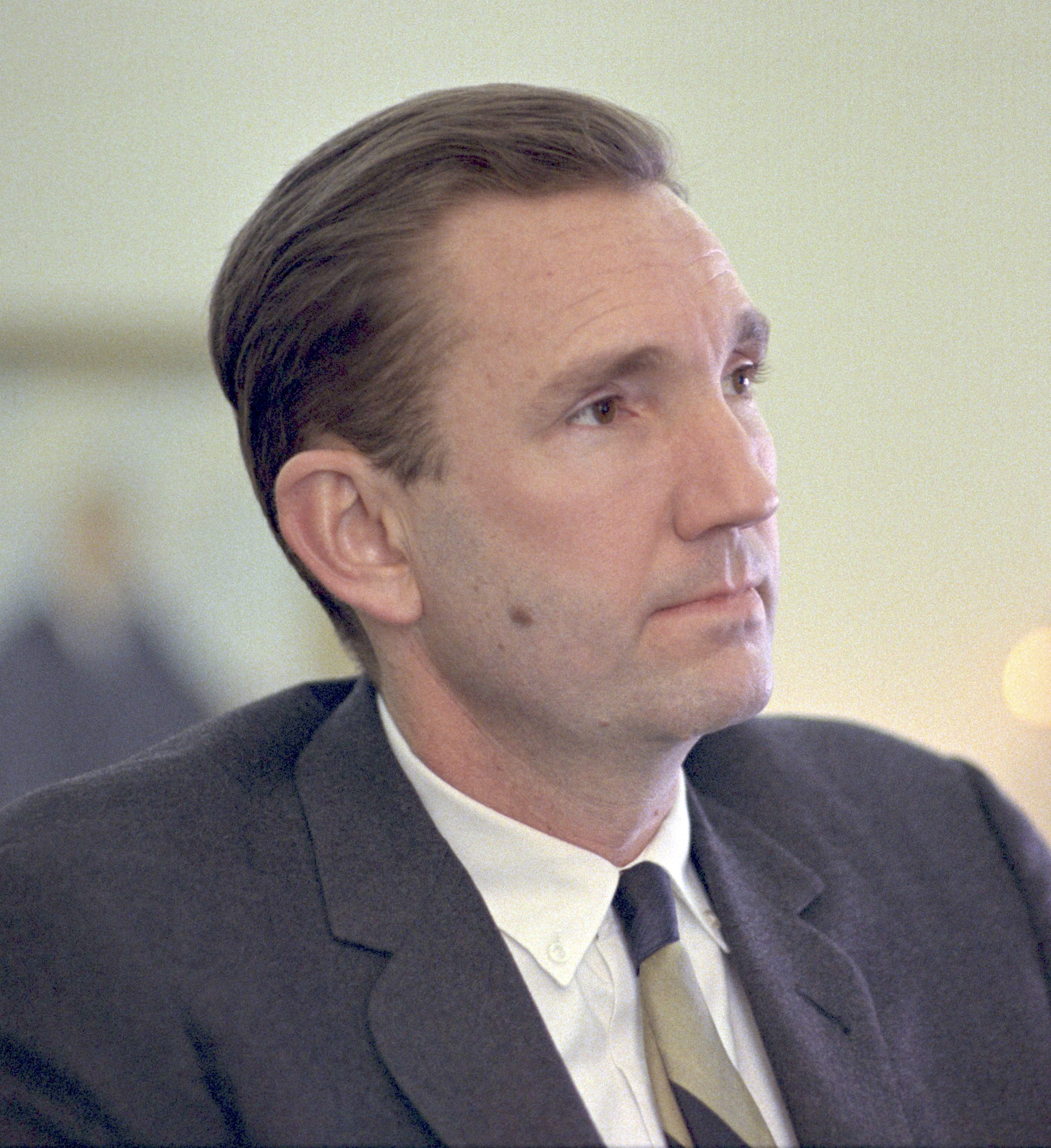
Former Attorney General Ramsey Clark rated jurors and led the discussion among defendants, attorneys, and social scientists about jury selection in the Harrisburg Seven case.

During jury selection in the United States, attorneys have two options for excluding potential jurors. The first option is a challenge for cause, in which attorneys must state the reason for a challenge (such as clear bias or a conflict of interest), the opposing party is allowed to respond, and the judge decides whether to exclude the juror. The second option is a peremptory challenge, where an attorney can exclude a juror without stating any reason. While challenges for cause are unlimited, attorneys have a limited number of peremptory challenges, sometimes as few as four, although 10 is more common in non-capital felony cases.

Attorneys have long used peremptory challenges to exclude undesirable prospective jurors, but have not always been successful at identifying these. Much of the early efforts were based on lawyers' folklore about who makes a good juror for their case. Early examples of scientific jury selection were similar. For example, in the 1975 Joan Little trial, defense attorneys used an astrologer to help choose the jury. More rigorous methodology was on display during the first major use of SJS, the 1972 Harrisburg Seven trial. During that trial, social scientists used demographic characteristics to identify biases in favor of conviction. The consultants in the case had conducted surveys that indicated women and Democrats would make defense-friendly jurors, and the religious, those with college degrees, and Reader's Digest subscribers would be better for the prosecution. Although surveys had indicated that 80% of citizens in conservative Harrisburg, Pennsylvania would convict the defendants, they were acquitted of all serious charges.

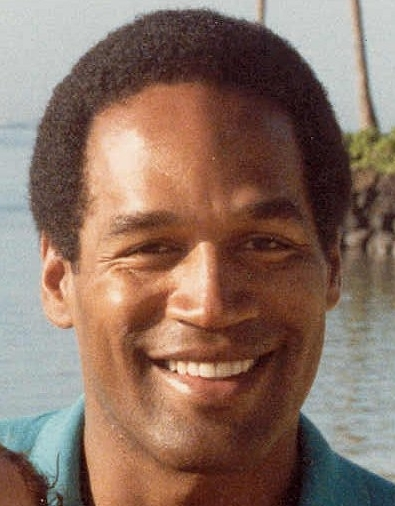
The O. J. Simpson murder trial was marked by efforts to choose a friendly jury.

A jury consultant helped pick the jury in the O. J. Simpson murder trial. Criminologist Jo-Ellan Dimitrius used surveys to determine the ideal defense juror demographic (black women) and analyzed and judged the prospective jurors' answers to a questionnaire and response and body language during voir dire (the stage of jury selection where lawyers are permitted to directly question the jury). Prosecutor Vincent Bugliosi gives more credit to the traditional change of venue. He argues that transferring the case to a section of Los Angeles with more blacks in the jury pool was most detrimental to the selection of a prosecution-friendly jury. The prosecutor dismissed her court-appointed jury consultant early in the process.

Contemporary jury consultants are often sociologists, people with experience in communications and marketing, or attorneys themselves, but they are most frequently psychologists who specialize in legal psychology. Although most of the practice's roots are in criminal trials, modern jury consultants are more often involved in torts (civil litigation), particularly where wealthy corporate defendants fear an enormous monetary judgment for the plaintiff, or where plaintiffs' attorneys have invested large sums of money in an important lawsuit. Since the 1980s, large jury and trial consulting firms have emerged, earning multi-million dollar revenues, mostly from such high-stakes civil litigation. The simultaneous shift from ad-hoc groups of academics to a business model has sparked the criticism that SJS magnifies the distorting effect money has on trials, since only the wealthy can afford it. Jury consultants argue that they operate in an adversarial process the same way lawyers do; by pursuing their clients' interests in a rule-bound framework. Jeffrey Abramson, who has written extensively about juries, argues that even if SJS is ethical or has zero effect, the mere myth of powerful, effective jury manipulators shakes public confidence in the jury system.

== Methods ==
The theory behind SJS is that juror attitudes predict voting preferences most effectively. By discovering what relationships exist between certain attitudes, attorneys can exclude those from the jury whose attitudes would predispose them to an unfavorable verdict. Researcher Shari Diamond indicates that jury consultants primarily rely on two methods: telephone surveys and mock trials (trial simulations). Telephone surveys are the practitioners' "primary research method". During a survey of the community where the trial is taking place, jury consultants ask about:

1. background characteristics of the jury pool such as race, sex, marital status, age, income, and job; and perhaps more specific questions that depend upon the case itself;
2. beliefs and attitudes likely associated with a favorable or unfavorable verdict; and
3. (after reading a summary of the facts of the case) which verdict the survey respondent would favor.

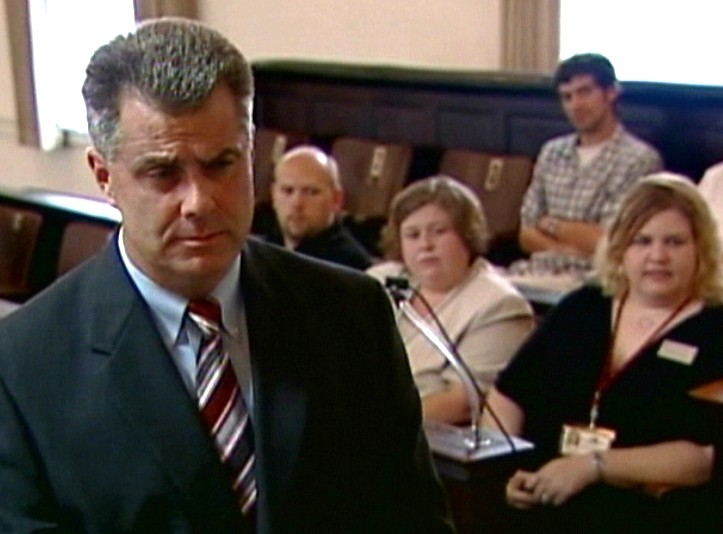
An attorney asking questions during jury selection.

Diamond writes that jury consultants then compare the three data sets to determine which background characteristics correlate to favorable attitudes and verdicts, and which attitudes correlate to favorable verdicts. Attorneys can then use that information to select favorable jurors, based either on prospective jurors' characteristics or whatever an attorney can learn about jurors' attitudes. This has prompted the most frequent criticism of SJS: that consultants stack juries with favorably biased or credulous jurors; in turn, practitioners insist this is impossible and that bias can only be removed from a jury pool.

An alternative is to test respondents at the researcher's facility with opening statements or a full-blown mock trial instead of reading a case summary over the telephone. The higher cost of a mock trial allows for a more realistic portrayal of the real trial and (researchers hope) more accurate data. It also provides a better opportunity to question the subjects, before and after the trial simulation. On the other hand, telephone surveys provide a larger and more representative sample of the jury pool. Diamond indicates that since both methods have advantages, SJS practitioners commonly rely on both in the same case.

Besides the occasional astrologer or psychic, a few practitioners use unorthodox methods, such as in-courtroom assessment of posture, pupil dilation, or breathing to judge jurors both during selection and during trial. Though such methods have the veneer of science, psychologists reject them as nonsense and "science fiction". Notwithstanding this, Jo-Ellan Dimitrius (from the Simpson trial) indicates that she also relies on appearance, body language, conduct, and even smells such as perfume or medication. She sometimes decides based upon her "gut feeling" about a juror.

Research psychologists Kassin and Wrightsman indicate that the model employed (demographic factors predict attitudes that predict verdicts) has empirical weaknesses. That attitudes predict verdicts is taken for granted and rarely studied. For example, veterans might favor current troops, but that does not necessarily translate into a likelihood to acquit their brethren of crimes. However, the relationship between demographics and verdicts can be more reliably predicted by mock trials. Successful prediction of jury verdicts often requires data specific to the case and jurisdiction. The sheer number of ways that one case can be unique outstrips the published research on the subject, so original research is often required. That necessity is exacerbated by the fact that many modern consultants are reluctant to share knowledge, even with other firms, because of paranoia, client confidentiality, and their regard for their work as "trade secrets".

One important variation is "group dynamics analysis". Some jury selection is concerned with the attitudes and bias of individuals. Some trial consultants also try to predict how individuals will form themselves into groups in the jury and which jurors will become leaders and followers in those groups. Consultants also use this tool after jury selection is over.

== Efficacy ==
Although advocates and practitioners of scientific jury selection claim the practice is overwhelmingly effective at choosing juries that will render the desired verdict, its true effect is often more difficult to discern. Part of this difficulty is in duplicating the conditions of a real trial. In one experiment, two kinds of shadow juries watched a trial and rendered a verdict. The results indicated that the juries were substantially different, but that this difference was likely due to the two experimental juries' knowledge that they were not deciding an actual verdict, prompting a lower burden of proof.

Another simplified experiment indicated that lawyers trained in a systematic selection method made better predictions of juror verdicts in two of four cases – the sale of illegal drugs and a military court-martial (the other two cases were murder and drunk driving). The systematic method was more effective in those two cases where the predictive relationships between demographic variables and attitudes/verdicts were strongest, and least effective where such predictive relationships were weak or nonexistent.

Some academic researchers argue that the actual efficacy of SJS is obscured by poor research methodology. Specifically, demographic characteristics used to predict juror attitudes and juror verdicts may not hold true across all types of cases. For example, men convict more frequently than women in some types of criminal trials but less frequently in others. Besides this, demographic characteristics are often less predictive than the attitudes jurors hold; for example, attitudes towards rape are better verdict-predictors than gender in rape trials.

The actual efficacy of jury consultants may not be very important because the demographic composition of the jury has little effect on the verdict it renders, usually causing only a 5%–15% variance in verdicts. The evidence presented at trial has far more impact on what the verdict will be. As Kressel and Kressel indicate, "when the evidence is strong, nothing else matters much" and even when the evidence is ambiguous, demographic characteristics of jurors are a relatively minor influence. Some researchers argue that a significant improvement in jury selection, however small, may be worthwhile when the stakes are high, as with a defendant accused of a capital crime or a corporation that stands to lose millions of dollars in a civil suit.

A popular "proof is in the pudding" argument is often made, especially by consultants themselves; the argument goes that since attorneys and clients pay such high fees (sometimes as much as $500,000) for consultants, their services must be effective. Others argue that most attorneys are unaware of the social science research on the topic.

The effectiveness of scientific jury selection has also been comparison tested against other methods, such as attorney folklore and intuition. For trial attorneys, justifying the expense of SJS is contingent upon an improvement over their own jury selection abilities. Several empirical studies of traditional jury selection (by attorneys acting alone) have indicated that it and SJS are about equally effective.

== Suggested reforms ==
In light of the criticisms leveled against scientific jury selection—that it lets lawyers stack juries and increases the influence of money—several reforms have been proposed. One common reform proposal is the elimination of peremptory challenges. Supreme Court precedent already forbids use of peremptories (peremptory challenges) to exclude jurors based solely on their race or sex. (Note: Batson v. Kentucky (1986) is the seminal case in this area, finding race-based use of peremptory challenges by prosecutors unconstitutional. Georgia v. McCollum (1992) extended the same prohibition to defense attorneys. The relevant precedents in civil law are Edmonson v. Leesville Concrete Company (1991) (regarding race) and J.E.B. v. Alabama (1994) (regarding gender).) Proponents argue that doing away with peremptories altogether will eliminate the perceived and real injustice of permitting lawyers to eliminate jurors dispositionally unfavorable to them without a challenge for cause argument in open court. Opponents counter that attorneys cannot always ferret out actionable evidence of juror bias, particularly in the context of a limited voir dire.

Other proposals include:

- lower the number of peremptories to force attorneys to use them only on the most clearly biased jurors and severely curtail their ability to "shape" the jury with peremptory challenges.
- ban jury consulting through legislative action, though it may be impossible to fairly draw a line that excludes SJS but doesn't exclude advice from other attorneys in the same firm, for example.
- limit useful information by severely curtailing verbal questioning and written questionnaires of prospective jurors. This may have the perverse effect of encouraging many erroneous Batson challenges based solely on race or gender instead of more sophisticated metrics of bias.
- prohibit investigation of the jury pool or release the list of prospective jurors on the eve of jury selection to make investigation of prospective jurors impossible.
- force disclosure of consultant use by making surveys of prospective jurors or the community discoverable by (legally accessible to) the opposing party. If consultants' research is discoverable, each party could use and benefit from their research.

Despite serious discussion among lawyers, scholars, legislators, and others about various reform proposals, none have been implemented and no consensus exists about which remedy, if any, would be the most appropriate and effective.

== In fiction ==
The major fictional representations to date have largely portrayed jury consultants as villains that are highly effective at influencing the jury, often using illegal tactics that mainstream practitioners do not use. Consultants are major characters in John Grisham's novel The Runaway Jury and the similar film adaptation. In the film, Rankin Fitch, "jury consultant for the defense", leads a team that uses high technology and sometimes-illegal tactics to prevent a judgment against their corporate client in what Salon calls "our worst nightmare of corporate arm-twisting". Writing about the book, Kressel and Kressel say Grisham "plays on fears that the American justice system has been hijacked by crafty attorneys and immensely effective hired-gun social scientists". Jean Hanff Korelitz's A Jury of Her Peers stretches the known reality of consulting much further. Korelitz's fictional consultants are part of an unscrupulous firm that charges prosecutors to kidnap homeless people, program them with drugs into conviction-only jurors, and substitute them for those hoping to avoid jury duty. Jonakait says the novel is "hardly realistic" but "reveals the distrust engendered by jury consultants".

In a fifth-season episode of the CBS television series Numb3rs, entitled "Guilt Trip", an illegal arms dealer (James Marsters) is tried for racketeering and the murder of the key witness against him. After he is unexpectedly acquitted, the investigation reveals that he had hired a sleazy jury consultant to not only identify those jurors who would most likely sway the rest of the jury's deliberations, so as to bribe and extort them into pushing for acquittal, but also train one of his henchmen to pose as the perfect "prosecutor's juror" and get placed on the jury. In season one, episode eleven, of the television series Leverage, a pharmaceutical company is under fire for a wrongful death case involving a stimulative all-natural herbal supplement. In an attempt to prevent major losses for the pharmaceutical company in question, and to protect the investment of a soon-to-be-parent company's subsidiary, scientific jury selection is used. However, the Leverage team thwarts their efforts every step of the way, similar to a giant chess match.

In the CBS television show Bull, the lead character operates a trial analysis company, which specializes in utilizing psychological profiles built by observing jurors during voir dire and online profiles to both select the jury and try arguments against mirror jurors. The show is based on the early career of Dr. Phil McGraw.
