= Foster v. Chatman =

- Supreme Court of the United States

Argued November 2, 2015 Decided May 23, 2016
- Full case name: Timothy Tyrone Foster, Petitioner v. Bruce Chatman, Warden
- Docket no.: 14-8349
- Citations: 578 U.S. 488 (more) 136 S. Ct. 1737; 195 L. Ed. 2d 1
- Argument: Oral argument
- Opinion announcement: Opinion announcement

Case history
- Prior: Defendant found guilty in Floyd County Superior Court; Supreme Court of Georgia affirmed, 258 Ga. 736, 374 S.E.2d 188 (1988); cert. denied, 490 U.S. 1085 (1989).; State court habeas petition denied; appeal denied by Supreme Court of Georgia; cert. granted, 135 S. Ct. 2349 (2015).

Holding
- The Court has jurisdiction to review the judgment of the Georgia Supreme Court denying Foster a Certificate of Probable Cause on his Batson claim. The decision that Foster failed to show purposeful discrimination was clearly erroneous under the three-step process established by Batson.

Court membership
- Chief Justice John Roberts Associate Justices Anthony Kennedy · Clarence Thomas; Ruth Bader Ginsburg · Stephen Breyer; Samuel Alito · Sonia Sotomayor; Elena Kagan

Case opinions
- Majority: Roberts, joined by Kennedy, Ginsburg, Breyer, Sotomayor, Kagan
- Concurrence: Alito (in judgment)
- Dissent: Thomas

Laws applied
- U.S. Const. amend. XIV

Foster v. Chatman, 578 U.S. 488 (2016), was a United States Supreme Court case in which the Court held that the state law doctrine of res judicata does not preclude a Batson challenge against peremptory challenges if new evidence has emerged. The Court held the state courts' Batson analysis was subject to federal jurisdiction because "[w]hen application of a state law bar 'depends on a federal constitutional ruling, the state-law prong of the court’s holding is not independent of federal law, and our jurisdiction is not precluded,'" under Ake v. Oklahoma.

It held that the petitioner, Timothy Foster, had established purposeful discrimination, and that as a result, the state habeas court and Supreme Court of Georgia had erred in denying his Batson claim that black jurors were struck from his jury pool on the basis of race. In concluding its opinion, the Court noted that "[t]wo peremptory strikes on the basis of race are two more than the Constitution allows." The court frequently cited Snyder v. Louisiana in its decision.

== Background ==
In 1986 Timothy Foster, a black 18-year-old, was accused of killing Queen Madge White, a 79-year-old white woman and retired schoolteacher in Georgia. She had been sexually assaulted and murdered in her home, which was ransacked. A month later, law enforcement officers were called to a domestic disturbance at the home of Lisa Stubbs. She told the officers that her boyfriend, Foster, had killed White and given items stolen from White's house to her and various family members. Foster was arrested, admitted to the crime, and some of the stolen items from White's house were recovered from Foster's residence.

During jury selection, the prosecutors used peremptory strikes to remove all four black prospective jurors from the jury pool, resulting in an all-white jury. Foster challenged these strikes, arguing that they were racially motivated in violation of Batson v. Kentucky. The trial judge dismissed the challenge and empaneled the jury, which convicted Foster of the murder and sentenced him to death. After sentencing, Foster filed a motion for a new trial on the grounds that the jury selection violated the US Supreme Court's Batson decision. The trial court denied the motion, the Georgia Supreme Court affirmed the dismissal, and the U.S. Supreme Court denied certiorari.

Foster raised a habeas corpus challenge in the state court. During the habeas proceedings, Foster submitted a freedom of information request, under the Georgia Open Records Act, to obtain the prosecution's file for his trial. Among the documents produced by the request were numerous documents which the prosecution used during the jury selection process. The prosecutors had made notes on these:

- highlighted all the black prospective jurors on the jury list with a key indicating that the highlighting "represents Blacks";
- created a list of six "definite NO’s", of which the first five were all of the black prospective jurors;
- circled the race of each black prospective juror on their questionnaires;
- denoted, in handwritten notes, three of the black prospective jurors with "B#1", "B#2", and "B#3"
- and created a handwritten document titled "Church of Christ", which had an annotation stating "NO. No Black Church";

The prosecutors had also drafted an affidavit for the trial judge in response to Foster's motion for a new trial. It contained the statement: "If it comes down to having to pick one of the black jurors, [this one] might be okay. This is solely my opinion .... Upon picking of the jury after listening to all of the jurors we had to pick, if we had to pick a black juror I recommend that [this juror] be one of the jurors." The statement was crossed-out by hand and was omitted in the affidavit filed with the court.

Despite this new evidence, the state court rejected Foster's habeas petition stating that the new evidence did not present "purposeful discrimination" and so did not provide sufficient reason to go against the doctrine of res judicata. The Georgia Supreme Court denied a "Certificate of Probable Cause" necessary, under state law, to appeal the habeas decision, determining that the case had no "arguable merit" The Georgia Supreme Court's decision in its entirety said: "Upon the consideration of the Application for Certificate of Probable Cause to appeal the denial of habeas corpus, it is ordered that it be hereby denied. All the Justices concur, except Benham, J., who dissents." Since the petition for certiorari to the Supreme Court was appealing the Georgia Supreme Court's order, it was unclear whether the order "rests on an adequate and independent state law ground," which would preclude the U.S. Supreme Court's jurisdiction over Foster's federal claim.

== Oral arguments ==
In an unusual turn of events, the US Supreme Court notified the attorneys for both sides that the justices may pose questions regarding the jurisdiction of the Court to hear the case. Advocating for Foster, Stephen B. Bright started his arguments with a criticism of the prosecutors' alleged racial motives coming into jury selection, but he was soon interrupted by Chief Justice Roberts asking for Bright to address the jurisdictional issues. Much of his speaking time was spent answering these procedural questions.

Getting to the merits, Bright argued that the race-neutral reasons for the strikes were contradicted by the prosecution's actions and the documents Foster obtained. In response to a question by Chief Justice Roberts, Bright pointed out that, despite the prosecution claiming they struck the black prospective jurors because they were women, the prosecution accepted other non-black women onto the jury. (Note: The protections of Batson were not extended to gender until J.E.B. v. Alabama eight years later.)

== Opinion of the Court ==
In a 7–1 decision authored by Chief Justice Roberts, the Court held that it did have jurisdiction to review the case and held that Foster did indeed show significant purposeful racial discrimination in the jury selection. Justice Alito wrote an opinion concurring in the judgment to describe the state law on the matter, while Justice Thomas dissented. Both Justice Alito's concurrence and Justice Thomas's dissent pointed out that, under Georgia state law, Foster's murder conviction and death sentence may not be nullified by the decision.

=== Majority ===
As a threshold matter, the U.S. Supreme Court determined that the lower court's habeas decision was not independent of federal issues and therefore does not bar review by the U.S. Supreme Court. Both parties agreed that Foster brought a prima facie case and that the prosecutors offered race-neutral explanations for striking the black prospective jurors, the first two prongs of the three-prong test in Batson. The court examined the reasons for striking two of the black prospective jurors—Garrett and Hood—and found the reasons did not withstand scrutiny, concluding that:

As we explained in Miller-El v. Dretke, "if a prosecutor's proffered reason for striking a black panelist applies just as well to an otherwise-similar nonblack [panelist] who is permitted to serve, that is evidence tending to prove purposeful discrimination." 545 U.S. 231, 241 (2005). With respect to Garrett and Hood, such evidence is compelling. But that is not all. There is also the shifting explanations, the misrepresentations of the record, and the persistent focus on race in the prosecution's file. Considering all of the circumstantial evidence that "bear[s] upon the issue of racial animosity," we are left with the firm conviction that the strikes of Garrett and Hood were "motivated in substantial part by discriminatory intent." Snyder, 552 U.S., at 478, 485.

— Foster, slip op. at 23

=== Justice Alito's opinion concurring in the judgment ===
Justice Alito wrote separately "to explain [his] understanding of the role of state law in the proceedings that must be held on remand." Justice Alito explained that the lower court's habeas decision noted that Foster's Batson claim was based on new evidence discovered after Foster's original trial and therefore the order of the Georgia Supreme Court "held ... that Foster's Batson claim, as presented in his state habeas petition, lacked arguable merit." Justice Alito noted that many states do not permit relitigation of previously-argued claims and that "[s]tates are under no obligation to permit collateral attacks on convictions that have become final." Justice Alito concurred that the correct decision in this case was "to decide the question of federal law and then to remand the case to the state court so that it can reassess its decision on the state-law question in light of [the U.S. Supreme Court's] decision on the underlying federal issue." He agreed in the court's finding that the prosecutor's striking of the black prospective jurors was a Batson violation.

=== Justice Thomas' dissenting opinion ===
Justice Thomas dissented. Justice Thomas criticized the court's determination of jurisdiction, arguing that "[t]he far more likely explanation for the [Georgia Supreme Court's] denial of habeas relief is that Foster's claim is procedurally barred ...[,] a question of state law that [the U.S. Supreme Court] is powerless to review." Justice Thomas notes that historically the Supreme Court would vacate and remand for clarification before proceeding to the merits of a case like this and "refuse[d] to presume that the unexplained denial of relief by the Supreme Court of Georgia presents a federal question." Justice Thomas then proceeded to reject the court's analysis of the Batson claim.
