= Powers v. Ohio =

- Supreme Court of the United States

Argued October 9, 1990 Decided April 1, 1991
- Full case name: Powers v. Ohio
- Docket no.: 89-5011
- Citations: 499 U.S. 400 (more)

Holding
- Under the Equal Protection Clause, a criminal defendant may object to race-based exclusions of jurors through peremptory challenges whether or not the defendant and the excluded jurors share the same race.

Court membership
- Chief Justice William Rehnquist Associate Justices Byron White · Thurgood Marshall; Harry Blackmun · John P. Stevens; Sandra Day O'Connor · Antonin Scalia; Anthony Kennedy · David Souter

Case opinions
- Majority: Kennedy, joined by White, Marshall, Blackmun, Stevens, O'Connor, Souter
- Dissent: Scalia, joined by Rehnquist

Laws applied
- U.S. Const. amends. XIV

Powers v. Ohio, 499 U.S. 400 (1991), was a United States Supreme Court case that re-examined the Batson Challenge. Established by Batson v. Kentucky, 476 U.S. 79 (1986), the Batson Challenge prohibits jury selectors from using peremptory challenges on the basis of race, ethnicity, gender, and sex. Powers expanded the jurisdictions of this principle, allowing all parties within a case, defendants especially, to question preemptory challenges during a jury selection, regardless of race. This holding was protected under the Equal Protection Clause of the Fourteenth Amendment.

== Background ==
Larry Joe Powers, a white defendant, was prosecuted on two counts of murder and one count of attempted murder in Franklin County, Ohio. Under the Sixth Amendment, Powers requested a jury trial to help prove him innocent; however, during the jury selection process, seven Black prospective jurors were cut out from the final jury selection. Powers objected and requested an explanation as to why these prospective jurors were excluded. The Court dismissed his objection, and in the trial Powers was found guilty of all charges. The court sentenced him to 53 years in prison.

Following his conviction, Powers went to the Ohio Court of Appeals under the belief that his Sixth and Fourteenth Amendment rights were infringed upon. According to Powers, he was not given a fair, impartial jury because of racially justified preemptory challenges. This move was ultimately another infringement upon the Equal Protection Clause of the Fourteenth Amendment.

Powers argued his status as a white man was irrelevant to case at hand. He explained that he had the right to question "the prosecution's discriminatory use of peremptories." The Court of Appeals approved his appeal, but the Ohio Supreme Court denied his case. Powers, distraught, took it to the Supreme Court instead, where they agreed to review it.

As Powers's case was reviewed, the Supreme Court dealt with Holland v. Illinois. This case found that the Sixth Amendment did not prevent jury selectors from excluding potential jurors on the basis of race. With this new conclusion, Powers had to restructure his case around the Equal Protection Clause of the Fourteenth Amendment.

== Decision ==
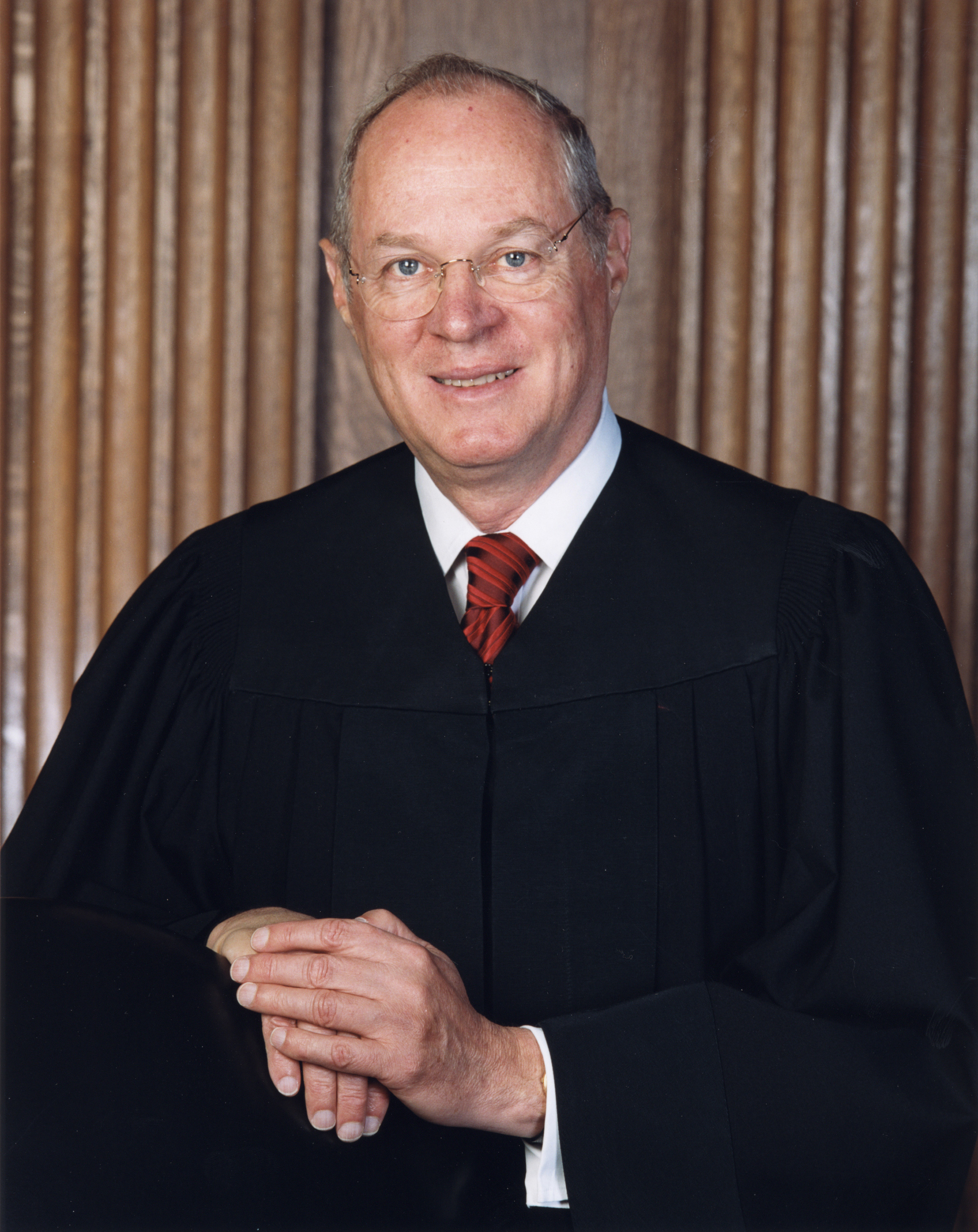
Justice Anthony M. Kennedy, leading majority opinion for Powers v. Ohio.

The Court came to multiple conclusions with this case. For starters, it did establish, once again, that racial bias and discrimination in juries and jury selection processes were unconstitutional. Justice Anthony Kennedy delivered the following statement in regards to this: "Invoking the Equal Protection Clause and federal statutory law, and relying upon well-established principles of standing, we [the Supreme Court of the United States] hold that a criminal defendant may object to race-based exclusions of jurors effected through peremptory challenges whether or not the defendant and the excluded jurors share the same race." Additionally, the Supreme Court concluded that "discriminatory use of peremptories harms the excluded jurors by depriving them of a significant opportunity to participate in civil life."

As the justices came to this conclusion, they drew heavily from Swain v. Alabama, where the court concluded: "[the] state's purposeful or deliberate denial to Negroes on account of race of participation as jurors in the administration of justice violates the Equal Protection Clause." Ultimately, the state has a right to practice peremptory challenges in the jury selection process; however, this right is only protected "as long as that reason is related to the outcome" (United States v. Robinson). Powers v. Ohio helped reaffirm this.

The case also addressed a provision Batson v. Kentucky failed to. In Batson v. Kentucky, Batson, the black defendant of the case, called out racially based discrimination in the courtroom. The court agreed with him, and concluded that racially motivated peremptory challenges were unconstitutional; however, the Batson court argued that: "a criminal defendant may object to race-based... peremptory challenges whether or not the defendant and excluded juror share the same race." The Powers decision re-examined this provision and established that defendants have the right to call out and question racial discrimination in the courtroom regardless of a difference in race. In other words, a white defendant could question the exclusion of a black juror and vice versa as it was a defendant's right to question the integrity of their impartial trial without race standing in the way of that.

In the final decision, the Court ruled in favor of Powers's question in a 7–2 decision; but, it did not overrule Powers's personal case. The Court's majority opinion explained, "if for any reason the State is unable to reconvict Powers for the double murder at issue here, later victims may pay the price for our extravagance...crime would go unpunished and criminals go free." While racial discrimination was unconstitutional, it did not take away from Power's crimes. Thus Powers v. Ohio re-examined the Batson Challenge and expanded its jurisdictions, but it did not directly address or overturn Powers's status as guilty.

== Later developments ==
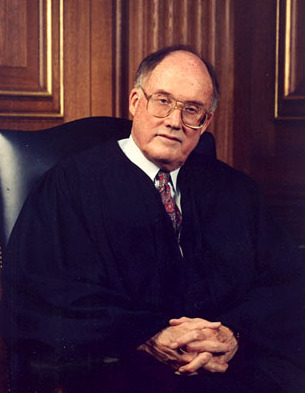
Chief Justice William Rehnquist, important voice in the dissent of the case. Along with Marshall, Stevens, Blackmun, White, and O'Connor, Rehnquist was part of the Court that decided Batson v. Kentucky.

Powers v. Ohio was an important case that helped continue to remove discrimination within the courtroom. However, it did not entirely dismantle discrimination in jury selection. Questions about the constitutionality of race-based peremptory challenges by defendants were not addressed in this case. The following year, such challenges were held unconstitutional in Georgia v. McCollum.
