= Flowers v. Mississippi =

- Supreme Court of the United States

Argued March 20, 2019 Decided June 21, 2019
- Full case name: Curtis Giovanni Flowers, Petitioner v. Mississippi
- Docket no.: 17-9572
- Citations: 588 U.S. 284 (more) 139 S. Ct. 2228; 204 L. Ed. 2d 638

Case history
- Prior: Convictions reversed, 773 So. 2d 309 (2000); 947 So. 2d 910 (2007); conviction and death sentence affirmed, 158 So. 3d 1009 (Miss. 2014); vacated and remanded, 136 S. Ct. 2157 (2016); conviction and sentence affirmed, 240 So. 3d 1082 (Miss. 2017); cert. granted, 139 S. Ct. 451 (2018).

Holding
- The trial court clearly erred when it concluded that the state's peremptory strike of a particular Black prospective juror was not substantially motivated by discriminatory intent.

Court membership
- Chief Justice John Roberts Associate Justices Clarence Thomas · Ruth Bader Ginsburg; Stephen Breyer · Samuel Alito; Sonia Sotomayor · Elena Kagan; Neil Gorsuch · Brett Kavanaugh

Case opinions
- Majority: Kavanaugh, joined by Roberts, Ginsburg, Breyer, Alito, Sotomayor, Kagan
- Concurrence: Alito
- Dissent: Thomas, joined by Gorsuch (Parts I, II, and III)

Laws applied
- Batson v. Kentucky

Flowers v. Mississippi, No. 17–9572, 588 U.S. 284 (2019), is a United States Supreme Court decision regarding the use of peremptory challenges to remove black jurors during a series of Mississippi criminal trials for Curtis Flowers, a black man convicted on murder charges. The Supreme Court held in Batson v. Kentucky that the use of peremptory challenges solely on the basis of race is unconstitutional. This case examined whether the Mississippi Supreme Court erred in how it applied Batson to this case. The Supreme Court ruled that Flowers' case fell under Batson and that the state inappropriately removed most of the potential black jurors during the trials.

== Background ==
Peremptory challenges have a long history in the common law. In the United States they have been allowed by statute in federal criminal trials since 1790. States are generally free to legislate their own rules and procedures for peremptory challenges as long as they don't violate the Equal Protection Clause of the Fourteenth Amendment. In other words, peremptory challenges that discriminate on the basis of race are banned by the Fourteenth Amendment. Batson v. Kentucky (1986) created a three step procedure for analyzing peremptory challenges. The first step requires a criminal defendant to show that peremptory challenges were discriminatory. Before Batson overturned Swain v. Alabama defendants seeking to reverse criminal convictions required far more than a showing of race-based peremptory challenges in a single trial. Following Batson striking a single juror for a discriminatory purpose may be enough to show prima facie discrimination. Batson's second step requires the prosecution to offer a race-neutral explanation for striking the juror. At the last step the trial court decides if the prosecutor's race-neutral explanation was mere pretext for purposeful discrimination.

== Case history ==
Curtis Flowers, a black man, was accused in 1996 of four murders in a furniture store in Winona, Mississippi. Three of the victims were white and one was black. Since his arrest, Flowers has seen six separate jury trials all by the same white prosecutor. The first three convictions were reversed by the Mississippi Supreme Court, citing prosecutorial misconduct in all three trials, and remanded for trial again. The first conviction was reversed because of false statements made by the prosecutor to mislead the jury. The second and third convictions involved Batson violations. The fourth and fifth ended in a mistrial.

At issue throughout these trials was the prosecutor's use of peremptory challenges to eliminate prospective African-Americans from the jury, leaving a solely white jury despite the population distribution near Winona being near 50% white, 50% African-American. Only by the fourth trial did two African-Americans sit on the jury, resulting in a hung jury. The sixth trial, held in 2010, found Flowers guilty of all four crimes, and he was sentenced to death. The jury here included one African-American juror—the first one questioned by the prosecutor who subsequently used his remaining peremptory challenges to dismiss five additional African-American jurors. Flowers appealed to the Mississippi Supreme Court again challenging the peremptory challenges. The Mississippi Supreme Court said the prosecutor had given adequate race neutral explanations for the strikes.

Flowers sought review for the prosecutor's "history of adjudicated purposeful discrimination" at the United States Supreme Court. Technically, the sixth conviction was the only one before the Supreme Court, but the same prosecutor had tried Flowers six times. In 2016, the US Supreme Court vacated the Mississippi Supreme Court and sent the case back for consideration after the Foster v. Chatman decision. The Mississippi Supreme Court reaffirmed their decision, once again ruling that the prosecutor had not been racially biased in his use of peremptory challenges during Flowers' trial. They said the previous findings of Batson violations in the second and third trials need not be taken into consideration when evaluating the prosecutor's explanation for strikes during the sixth trial. They said there were no "exceptional circumstances" like the ones in Foster preventing the court from deferring to "the trial court's factual determinations".

Flowers again petitioned the Supreme Court, which granted certiorari to the case in November 2018. The case was limited to the question of whether Mississippi's oversight of the prosecution's past use of peremptory challenges in Flowers' prior trials was proper within the scope of the Batson challenge. Oral arguments were heard on March 20, 2019.

== Opinions ==
=== Majority opinion by Brett Kavanaugh ===
On June 21, 2019, in a 7–2 decision authored by Associate Justice Brett Kavanaugh, the Supreme Court held that the Mississippi Supreme Court committed clear error in deciding the peremptory strike of Carolyn Wright was not "motivated in substantial part by discriminatory intent".

Although it is unusual for the Supreme Court to hear a case merely to correct an error, Justice Kavanaugh said the case was an enforcement of Batson that broke "no new legal ground".

Justice Kavanaugh said Flowers had established a successful Batson challenge based on the totality of circumstances. He identified "four critical facts":

1. The history of racially biased peremptory strikes in the previous trials
2. The five out of six black prospective jurors struck at the sixth trials
3. The disparate questioning of potential jurors
4. One of the black jurors was struck even though she was similarly situated to white jurors who were not struck

The Court said the "historical evidence" mattered: "The State's relentless, determined effort to rid the jury of black individuals strongly suggests that the State wanted to try Flowers before a jury with as few black jurors as possible, and ideally before an all-white jury". In its history of 6 trials prosecuting Flowers for murder, the previous 5 of which ended in mistrials or vacated convictions, the state struck 41 of the 42 prospective black jurors.

Kavanaugh says the trial court judge's ruling about discriminatory intent "did not sufficiently account for the history" of the first four trials.

To the second point, Kavanaugh says “The state’s decision to strike five of the six black prospective jurors is further evidence suggesting that the state was motivated in substantial part by discriminatory intent.”

Third, "the state spent far more time questioning the black prospective jurors than the accepted white jurors." This disparate questioning casts doubt on a prosecutor's race neutral explanations and "can be probative of discriminatory intent." The fact that a prosecutor does not ask prospective white jurors similar questions may show that he is fishing for pretextual reasons to justify striking black jurors: "A court confronting that kind of pattern can not ignore it."

Fourth, The Constitution does not allow striking even one juror for a discriminatory purpose. The Court found that the peremptory strike of Carolyn Wright was "motivated in substantial part by discriminatory intent." When a defendant can show that a prosecutor's race neutral reason for striking a black prospective juror applies to a nonblack juror who was allowed to serve, "that is evidence tending to prove purposeful discrimination." The prosecutor gave a factually inaccurate explanation for striking Carolyn Wright and several other black prospective jurors: "When considered with other evidence of discrimination, a series of factually inaccurate explanations for striking black prospective jurors can be telling. So it is here."

=== Concurrence by Samuel Alito ===
Samuel Alito wrote a concurrence. Alito stated that he believes this was “a highly unusual case” that was likely “one of a kind.” Alito also stated that this was “not an ordinary case, and the jury selection process cannot be analyzed as if it were.” He said he agreed with the reversal of the Mississippi Supreme Court only because of the "unique combinations of circumstances present" in the Flowers case.

=== Dissent by Clarence Thomas ===
Clarence Thomas wrote the dissenting opinion, which was joined in part by Neil Gorsuch, stating that they would have upheld Flowers’ conviction. Thomas suggested that the prosecution's use of their peremptory challenge was appropriate as most of those dismissed knew of Flowers and his family and thus would be biased on a jury. Thomas’ opinion suggests Batson v. Kentucky (1986), which forbids prosecutors from using race as a factor in making peremptory challenges in jury selection, was wrongly decided and should be overruled. Gorsuch, however, did not join the section of Thomas’ opinion suggesting Batson should be overruled.

== Subsequent events ==
State prosecutors officially dropped the charges against Flowers on September 4, 2020, with the state's attorney general's office stating that it would be nearly impossible to convict Flowers on any charges at this point due to the conflicts with the past court records being considered unusable leaving them with no new living witnesses.

== See also ==
- In the Dark (podcast), an American Public Media podcast whose 2nd season examined Flowers' case
