= Racial discrimination in jury selection =

Racial discrimination in jury selection is specifically prohibited by law in many jurisdictions throughout the world. In the United States, it has been defined through a series of judicial decisions. However, juries composed solely of one racial group are legal in the United States and other countries. While the racial composition of juries is not dictated by law, racial discrimination in the selection of jurors (regardless of the jury's ultimate composition) is specifically prohibited. Depending on context, the phrases "all-white jury" or "all-black jury" can raise the expectation that deliberations may be unfair.

== Australia ==
In Australia, the right to a representative jury is severely limited. Australian Aboriginals are overrepresented in the criminal justice system, but seldom appear on juries even in parts of Australia where they represent a sizable portion of the population.

Courts have examined objections raised when the selection of juries did not represent either the social class or ethnic background of the accused. Current law does not extend a legal right to that degree of representation on a jury, provided that selection of the jury pool has complied with the Juries Act 1967 (VIC).

There is a history of Aboriginal people being underrepresented in jury pools, or completely absent in juries selected to hear cases involving Aboriginal defendants. Some reasons offered are that Aboriginal people may be excluded from juries due to not being enrolled to vote (which is how juries are typically selected), or that they failed to respond to a summons, or because of challenges by the prosecution and defense attorneys, or because their English may be poor. Australia has mandatory voter enrolment and mandatory voting, but this is sometimes unenforced, especially in remote areas or among homeless people.

However, there is also evidence that Aboriginal people are disadvantaged by the criminal justice system itself and its processes (such as jury selection). The ALRC found that Aboriginal Australians were 7 times more likely to be charged with a crime and brought before the courts, and 12.5 times more likely to receive a sentence of imprisonment.

- In 1983, 16-year-old Aboriginal boy John Pat was attacked by five police officers and beaten to death in Roeburne, Western Australia. The officers were tried for manslaughter, but acquitted by an all-white jury after pleading self-defence.
- In 2004, Aboriginal man Cameron Doomadgee was arrested and died in a police cell on Palm Island, Queensland from injuries. In 2007, the arresting police officer Chris Hurley was charged with assault and manslaughter, but was later acquitted by an all-white jury.
- In 2019 in Yuendumu, Northern Territory, police officer Zachary Rolfe shot Walpiri man Kumanjayi Walker 3 times, killing him. This occurred shortly after Walker stabbed Rolfe with scissors. 3 days later, Rolfe was charged with murder. In 2022, Rolfe was acquitted unanimously. Juror candidates were drawn randomly. Rolfe's defence team used the majority of their 12 challenges to remove people of colour and those of Asian descent. In the end, the jury selected were all white with the exception of one young Asian woman, even though Indigenous people account for 30% of the Northern Territory population.

== Canada ==
Canada has also struggled with the issue of racial discrimination in jury selection, especially for First Nations people. In 2001, Indian and Northern Affairs Canada (INAC) stopped producing band lists of First Nations people living on reserve for provincial jury rolls because of privacy concerns. The exclusion of this information from provincial jury rolls meant First Nations people living on reserves were not properly represented on juries.

The removal of First Nations people living on reserves from provincial jury rolls directly collided with the Supreme Court of Canada's 1991 decision of R. V. Sherrat [1991] 1 SCR 509 wherein the Court found that the "representativeness right" is an essential component of the right to trial by jury. In particular, the Court pronounced that:

The perceived importance of the jury and the Charter right to jury trial is meaningless without some guarantee that it will perform its duties impartially and represent, as far as is possible and appropriate in the circumstances, the larger community. Indeed, without the two characteristics of impartiality and representativeness, a jury would be unable to perform properly many of the functions that make its existence desirable in the first place

The Supreme Court of Canada in 2015 evolved the issue of a "representative right" in jury trials in the case of R. V. Kokopenance, [2015] SCR 28 wherein the Court held that "an accused is not entitled to a jury that includes members of their own race or religion; rather, they are only entitled to a fair and honest process of random jury selection".

The issue of "representative right" is not dead or a decided issue. In 2018 the Federal Government introduced Bill C-75 in response to the Colten Boushie case. Bill C-75 eliminated peremptory challenges of jurors in criminal cases, thereby preventing the exclusion of jurors by both Crown and defense counsels. Bill C-75 became law on June 21, 2019, which coincidentally happens to be National Indigenous Peoples Day in Canada.

== United States ==
In the United States, racial discrimination in jury selection has a long history, even though a series of judicial decisions has determined that such discrimination violates the rights of defendants. While the racial composition of juries is not dictated by law, racial discrimination in the selection of jurors (regardless of the jury's ultimate composition) is specifically prohibited. However, the phrases "all-white jury" or "all-black jury" can raise a host of expectations – among them, the expectation that deliberations may be less than fair.

=== Current precedent and legal challenges ===
Under the standard set forth by the United States Supreme Court in Strauder v. West Virginia and Batson v. Kentucky, the striking of a juror on account of race denies a defendant equal protection under the constitution. However the court held that a defendant is not entitled to a jury containing or lacking members of any particular race, and the striking of jurors for race-neutral reasons is permissible. This standard has been extended to civil trials in Edmonson v. Leesville Concrete Company and on the basis of gender in J.E.B. v. Alabama ex rel. T.B.

=== History ===
==== Nineteenth century ====
Following the American Civil War, the 13th, 14th, and 15th Amendments to the U.S. Constitution had abolished slavery and guaranteed basic civil rights to African-Americans; the Civil Rights Act of 1875 extended this to "public accommodation" and jury selection, including the establishment of criminal penalties for court officers who interfered:

Sec 4. That no citizen possessing all other qualification which are or may be prescribed by law shall be disqualified for service as grand or petit juror in any court of the United States, or of any State, on account of race, color, or previous condition of servitude; and any officer or other person charged with any duty in the selection or summoning of jurors who shall exclude or fail to summon any citizen for the cause aforesaid shall, on conviction thereof, be deemed guilty of a misdemeanor, and be fined not more than five thousand dollars.

The United States Supreme Court ruled in 1880 in Strauder v. West Virginia that laws excluding black people from jury service violated the Equal Protection Clause of the 14th Amendment; yet in Virginia v. Rives (1879), the court denied an appeal from a black defendant who asked that black jurors be made at least one third of his jury, noting that an all-white jury was not in itself proof that a defendant's rights had been violated. Nevertheless, Southern states easily evaded Strauder and set up other ways than explicit legal bans to exclude black Americans from jury service.

In 1883, the Civil Rights Act of 1875 was overturned entirely by the Supreme Court, in an 8–1 decision. In 1896, the landmark Plessy v. Ferguson decision enshrined the unofficial civil code termed Jim Crow, ranging from separate but equal accommodation to voter disenfranchisement and jury exclusion; blacks were thus denied access to the public, political, and judicial spheres.

==== Twentieth century ====
In the 1931 case of the Scottsboro Boys, nine black youths were accused of raping two white women, one of whom later recanted her testimony. Eight of the defendants were sentenced to death (although none were executed). Defense attorney Samuel Leibowitz argued before the Alabama Supreme Court that black people had been kept off the jury rolls, and that names of black people had been added to the rolls after the trial to conceal this fact. The appeals in the case ultimately led to two landmark Supreme Court decisions. In Powell v. Alabama (1935), the Court ruled that criminal defendants are entitled to effective counsel, and in Norris v. Alabama (1935), that blacks may not be excluded systematically from jury service.

Despite Norris, the practice of excluding black people from juries did not disappear. In 1985, the Supreme Court in Batson v. Kentucky addressed a situation where a prosecutor had used his peremptory challenges to strike all four black candidates from a jury and obtained a conviction against the black defendant. The defendant was not able to demonstrate that the state's court system systematically excluded black people from juries but nonetheless raised due process and equal protection arguments in his particular case. In Batson, the court ruled that the defendant could make a prima facie case for purposeful racial discrimination in jury selection by relying on the record and that a State denies a defendant equal protection in a trial before a jury from which members of his race have been purposely excluded.

==== Twenty-first century ====
Batson did not eliminate the exclusion of black people from juries. Batson applied only in criminal trials, only to prosecutors, and only in situations where the challenged juror and the defendant were of the same race. The Mississippi Supreme Court noted, in reversing a 2004 murder conviction of a black man, where prosecutors used all 15 of their peremptory strikes to exclude black jurors: "racially motivated jury selection is still prevalent 20 years after Batson." In 2010, a white man in Alabama appealed his murder conviction and death sentence after a trial by 11 white jurors and 1 black juror, stating that jury selection was tainted by racial discrimination in excluding additional black jurors from his jury.

On December 15, 2016, the Kentucky Supreme Court, citing Batson, ruled that judges do not have authority to dismiss randomly selected jury panels for lack of racial diversity. The ruling arose from a decision by Jefferson County Circuit Court Judge Olu Stevens to dismiss a nearly all-white jury panel in a 2014 case involving a black defendant. When prosecutors in Louisville asked the Kentucky Supreme Court to review whether Judge Stevens abused his discretion in dismissing the all-white panel, Judge Stevens commented on Facebook that the prosecutor's request amounted to an attempt "to protect the right to impanel all-white juries." Judge Stevens also suggested "something much more sinister" and wrote that the prosecutor would "live in infamy." For his remarks, Judge Stevens received a 90-day suspension without pay, acknowledged he violated judicial canons and apologized for any statements that implied the prosecutor was racist.
