= Curtis Flowers =

Wrongfully convicted African-American man (1970–2026)

- Flowers in 2020, holding an ankle monitor he no longer needed to wear after charges were dropped for the final time
- Born: May 29, 1970
- Died: October 7, 2026 (aged 56); Winona, Mississippi, U.S.

Notes
- Imprisoned for over 22 years. Two mistrials and four overturned convictions because of repeated prosecutorial misconduct, the last by U.S. Supreme Court; Mississippi dropped the charges and the case was dismissed with prejudice.

Curtis Giovanni Flowers (May 29, 1970 – October 7, 2026) was an American man who was wrongly imprisoned and on death row for more than twenty-two years, during which he was tried for the same murders six separate times by the same prosecutor in the U.S. state of Mississippi. Four of these trials had resulted in convictions, all of which were overturned on appeal for repeated prosecutorial misconduct. Flowers was accused of committing the July 16, 1996, shootings of four people inside Tardy Furniture store in Winona, Mississippi, United States. Flowers was first convicted in 1997; in five of the six trials, the prosecutor, Montgomery County District Attorney Doug Evans, sought the death penalty against Flowers. As a result, Flowers was held on death row at the Parchman division of Mississippi State Penitentiary for more than 20 years.

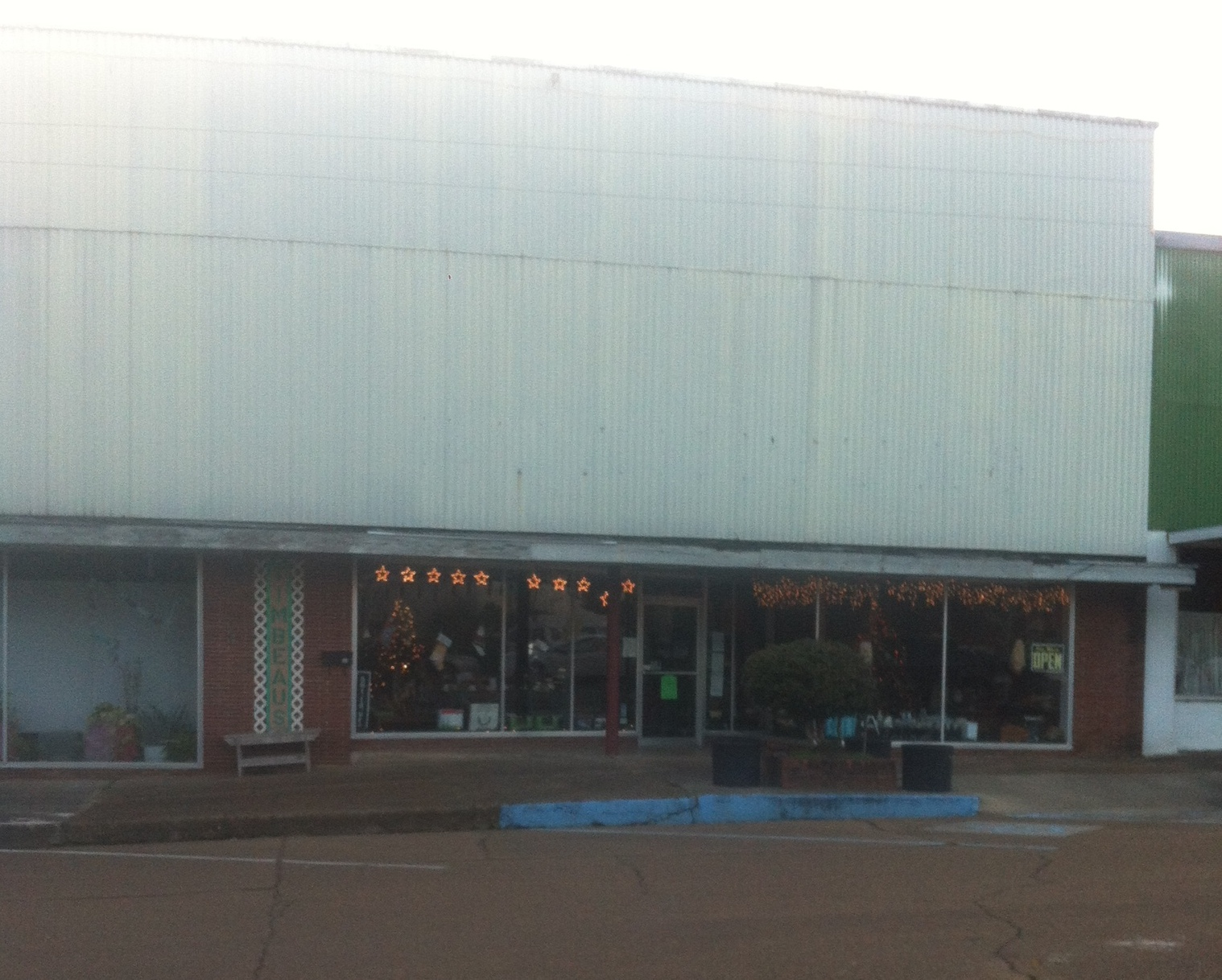
2015 photo of building where Tardy Furniture was located (33.481440°N 89.728119°W)

In his first trial, Flowers was convicted of the aggravated murder and robbery of the store owner. This verdict and a conviction in a second trial for the murder of one of the store employees were both overturned by the Mississippi Supreme Court in 2000 and 2003 due to prosecutorial misconduct. A subsequent trial for all four murders resulted in conviction, but this was overturned by the Mississippi Supreme Court in 2007 for racial bias by the prosecutor in jury selection: Flowers was black and the prosecution excluded a disproportionate number of black jurors. Flowers's fourth and fifth trials ended as mistrials. On June 18, 2010, a majority-white jury in Flowers's sixth trial convicted him of the 1996 murders and voted to impose a death sentence.

Flowers's case was one of three that the U.S. Supreme Court ruled in June 2016 were to be remanded to lower courts to be reviewed for evidence of racial bias in jury selection. In November 2017, the Mississippi Supreme Court reaffirmed the conviction. However, the U.S. Supreme Court again reviewed Flowers's case. It overturned, on a 7–2 vote, the murder convictions in June 2019 in the decision Flowers v. Mississippi, with Justice Brett Kavanaugh writing for the majority. Flowers's case also resulted the revelation of a history of jury selection bias committed by Evans. In December 2019, Flowers was released from prison for the first time since his original arrest, on a $250,000 bond, pending a state decision on whether it would attempt another prosecution. On September 4, 2020, Mississippi Attorney General Lynn Fitch, a Republican who had taken over the case from District Attorney Evans, announced she would not be seeking a seventh trial, and that she had dropped all of the charges against Flowers.

The Flowers case served as the subject of a 2018 podcast, In the Dark, on American Public Media. In early 2021, Flowers was awarded half a million dollars—the maximum allowed under Mississippi law providing compensation for wrongful incarceration. Under the agreed order, Mississippi was ordered to pay Flowers $50,000 per year for the next 10 years.

== Case ==
During the morning of July 16, 1996, a retired employee of Tardy Furniture entered the store and found three bodies: owner Bertha Tardy and employees Robert Golden and Carmen Rigby were deceased. A third employee, Derrick Stewart, who was 16 at the time, died later at the hospital. All had been fatally shot. Curtis Flowers was suspected after police learned that he had been fired from the store 13 days prior to the murders. He also owed Bertha Tardy $30 for a cash advance on his paycheck.

Certain eyewitnesses said that they had seen Flowers around the front of the store on the morning of the shootings. The murder weapon was not found, but bullets from the scene were determined to be the same caliber as a gun that had been stolen from Flowers's uncle's car the same day as the murders. The Mississippi Crime Lab found that bullets fired previously from the uncle's gun matched the ballistics evidence of bullets found at the murder scene. Flowers was charged with murder in the shooting deaths of the four victims.

== Trials and state-court appeals ==
=== Summary ===
State District Attorney Doug Evans prosecuted all six of the trials against Flowers. The first through third trials (1997, 1999, 2004) ended in convictions but they were then overturned by the Mississippi Supreme Court – the first two because of prosecutorial misconduct; the third because District Attorney Evans was found to have discriminated against black jurors during jury selection, but he was not penalized and continued to be present for the remaining trials.

The fourth (2007) and fifth (2008) ended in hung juries. The sixth (2010) resulted in a conviction, and an appeal failed.

In 2016 the U.S. Supreme Court referred the sixth trial back to the Mississippi Supreme Court for review of racial discrimination in jury selection. The following year the state court confirmed the original decision. The United States Supreme Court overturned Flowers's conviction in 2019 because of Evans's efforts to keep African-Americans off the jury. Flowers was then released on bail and awaited the court's decision. Evans then recused himself from the case and handed the case to the State Attorney General. It was then announced in 2020 that all of the charges against Flowers would be dropped.

=== First trial and appeals (1997–2000) ===
Trial 1: Oct. 1997
Judge Clarence E. Morgan III	Murder counts: 1 (Bertha Tardy)
Prosecution: Doug Evans	Jury: All white
Defense: John Gilmore; Billy Gilmore	Outcome: Guilty. Sentenced to death
Appeal: Conviction overturned in 2000 by Mississippi Supreme Court due to prosecutorial misconduct

Flowers was tried for the very first time back in 1997, before Judge Clarence E. Morgan III. The prosecutor decided to try Flowers for the death of the store owner, Bertha Tardy, as occurring in the course of a robbery. This would increase the penalty for conviction, making the defendant eligible for the death penalty. The prosecution said that bloody footprints found at the crime scene were a size 10½, the same as that worn by Flowers. They were identified as Fila's Grant Hill style, which witnesses said Flowers had been wearing that morning.

In addition, prosecution witnesses testified that projectiles found at the crime scene were most likely from a .380-caliber pistol, the same as a gun stolen from Flowers's uncle on the morning of the murders. Forensic evidence revealed gunpowder residue on Flowers's hand. $400 was found to be missing from the till, and $235 was found in Flowers's headboard. According to two of Flowers's cellmates in the first jail in which he was held, Flowers admitted to them that he had stolen the money and committed the murders. Flowers denied this. Of the original two witnesses to the confession, both later retracted their testimony. A third witness alleged a later confession by Flowers when he was waiting in a different prison, after the first trial, but that witness also later recanted their statement.

Flowers maintained that he was innocent of the murders for the entirety of the case and trials, and said that he had never admitted to any crimes to his cellmates. He stated he had simply stopped going to the job and was not even aware that he had been fired. He said that he was wearing Nike shoes that day, the clothes he wore did not match the description given by eyewitnesses, and the particulate matter on his hands was due to his having handled fireworks the day prior to the murders. In 1997 he was convicted of the murder of the store owner by an all-white jury and sentenced to death.

The conviction verdict in the first trial was overturned in 2000 by the Mississippi Supreme Court after Flowers appealed. The court held that evidence presented by Evans on behalf of the state was prejudicial because, in presenting evidence for all four murders, it went beyond that necessary to prove the murder of Tardy alone. In addition, the prosecutor was to believed to have posed questions "not in good faith" and "without basis in fact". The court remanded the case for a re-trial.

=== Second trial and appeals (1999–2003) ===
Trial 2: March 1999
Judge Clarence E. Morgan III	Murder counts: 1 (Derrick "Bobo" Stewart)
Prosecution: Doug Evans	Jury: 11 white, 1 black
Defense: Chokwe Lumumba; Harvey Freelon	Outcome: Guilty. Sentenced to death
Appeal: Conviction overturned in 2003 by Mississippi Supreme Court due to prosecutorial misconduct.

While the first case was still under appeal, prosecutors decided to initiate a second trial for the murder of employee Derrick Stewart at the Tardy store. Morgan was the judge of the trial yet again; there was only one black person serving on the jury. Scheduled for September 1998, the court granted the defense a change of venue, moving the trial to Harrison County due to the difficulties in getting a fair and impartial jury in Montgomery County, and the trial started in on March 22, 1999. Flowers was convicted on March 30 and sentenced to death. This verdict was also overturned (in 2003) on appeal by the Mississippi Supreme Court, which held that Evans's prosecution "employed many of the same tactics during the second trial" as it did in the first, the court had improperly allowed evidence regarding the other murders to be admitted, and that other prosecutorial errors had been made.

=== Third trial and appeals (2004–2007) ===
Trial 3: Feb. 2004
Judge Clarence E. Morgan III	Murder counts: 4
Prosecution: Doug Evans	Jury: 11 white, 1 black
Defense: Ray Charles Carter; Andre de Gruy; Stacy Ferraro	Outcome: Guilty. Sentenced to death
Appeal: Conviction overturned in 2007 by Mississippi Supreme Court due to prosecution's racial discrimination in jury selection.

A third trial on charges of four counts of murder was concluded on February 12, 2004, and Flowers was convicted of each murder. The jury sentenced him to death. Morgan was again the judge. The verdict was overturned in 2007 by the Mississippi Supreme Court as it held that Evans's peremptory challenges in jury selection were racially motivated and thus unconstitutional. During the selection process, Evans challenged African-American jurors with its first seven strikes, which resulted in a Batson challenge by the defense (Batson v. Kentucky (1986) established that peremptory challenge cannot be used to discriminate against jurors based on race, ethnicity, or sex). Following its submission of non-racial grounds for its challenges, Evans used all of the state's five remaining challenges to strike African-American jurors. This had left the jury with only two African-American jurors, one of which was subsequently excused after informing the judge that he could not be impartial. Evans then used the state's three alternate juror strikes to specifically exclude African-American jurors. The final jury consisted of one African-American and 11 whites jurors. (The county population is 45% African American.)

The state Supreme Court stated that there was disparate treatment by the prosecutor in evaluation of black jurors compared with white jurors on certain disqualifying issues such as the jurors' connections with the defendants and the jurors' willingness to select the death penalty; he struck black individuals from the jury on grounds for which he did not strike their white counterparts. In addition, the court found that although in many cases Evans presented race-neutral reasons to strike, he used the challenge process as "an exercise in finding race neutral reasons to justify racially motivated strikes". The Mississippi Supreme Court overturned the conviction, saying that there had been "as strong [a] case of racial discrimination as we have ever seen in the context of a Batson challenge".

=== Fourth trial (2007) ===
Trial 4: Nov. 2007
Judge Clarence E. Morgan III	Murder counts: 4
Prosecution: Doug Evans	Jury: 7 white, 5 black
Defense: Ray Charles Carter; Andre de Gruy	Outcome: Mistrial (hung jury)

At the fourth trial, before Morgan in 2007 on four counts of murder, the prosecution did not seek the death penalty on the request of family of the victims who, aware that the defense would have the harder task of appealing a higher court if the sentence was life in prison, wanted the trial concluded so they could 'move on'. Evans exhausted the state's peremptory challenges in jury selection striking off black candidates; the resulting jury, however, had five African Americans on it. The fourth trial ended in a mistrial, as the jury was split 7–5 in favor of conviction; votes could be classified by race, among other factors, with African Americans voting to acquit.

=== Fifth trial (2008) ===
Trial 5: Sept. 2008
Judge Joseph Loper	Murder counts: 4
Prosecution: Doug Evans	Jury: 9 white, 3 black
Defense: Alison Steiner; Ray Charles Carter; Andre de Gruy	Outcome: Mistrial (hung jury)

The prosecution sought the death penalty for Flowers for the four murders in his fifth trial, which took place in 2008. This time Joseph Loper sat as judge. On the first day of testimony, an alternate juror, the only black woman on the jury, was arrested for perjury for lying during jury selection when she told them that she had not known Flowers. The trial, with a jury of nine white and three black jurors, concluded in 2008 in a mistrial due to a hung jury. James Bibbs, an African American, was the sole juror opposed to conviction. Immediately after the trial the judge, Joseph Loper, accused Bibbs of perjury for having lied during jury selection. Loper recommended Bibbs be prosecuted by Doug Evans, who, after eight months, recused himself and the new prosecution dropped the charges against Bibbs as there was no evidence. Loper was also recused as judge in Bibbs's trial.

=== Sixth trial and appeals (2010–2014) ===
Trial 6: June 2010
Judge Joseph Loper	Murder counts: 4
Prosecution: Doug Evans	Jury: 11 white, 1 black
Defense: Alison Steiner; Ray Charles Carter; Andre de Gruy	Outcome: Guilty. Sentenced to death
Appeal: Conviction upheld in 2014 and 2017 by Mississippi Supreme Court. Conviction overturned in 2019 by U.S. Supreme Court due to prosecution's racial discrimination in jury selection.

A jury for a sixth capital murder trial was convened in Winona, Mississippi, on June 10, 2010; it was composed of eleven white jurors and one black juror, and presided over by Judge Loper. Following 30 minutes of deliberation, the jury found Flowers guilty of four counts of capital murder. After deliberating for approximately 90 minutes during the penalty phase, the jury returned a death sentence. An appeal by Flowers failed, the Mississippi Supreme Court ruling in 2014 that the conviction was to be upheld.

== First U.S. Supreme Court ruling ==
In June 2016, the U.S. Supreme Court included Flowers's case among three capital cases it remanded to lower courts to review for racial bias by the prosecution in jury selection. In November 2017, the Mississippi Supreme Court renewed its prior determination, and affirmed Flowers's conviction and death sentence from the sixth trial.

== In the Dark ==
In 2018, the second season of the American Public Media podcast In the Dark was based on the reporting about the Flowers case, hosted and reported by journalist Madeleine Baran. Through in-depth investigative reporting, serious doubt was cast on the legitimacy of the case against Flowers, including claims from numerous witnesses that they had perjured themselves, potential misconduct done by the prosecutor, and the disappearance of a gun, potentially the murder weapon, after it had been turned over to the police.

== Second U.S. Supreme Court ruling ==
New evidence uncovered during the In the Dark investigation was used by Flowers's lawyers to attempt to get his conviction overturned by the U.S. Supreme Court. A petition for a writ of certiorari was filed, seeking review of the Mississippi Supreme Court's application of Batson v. Kentucky. The U.S. Supreme Court granted the writ on November 2, 2018.

The court heard oral argument on March 20, 2019. Amicus briefs on behalf of Flowers were filed by the Magnolia Bar Association, the Mississippi Center for Justice, and Innocence Project New Orleans. On June 21, 2019, the U.S. Supreme Court overturned Flowers's sixth conviction with a vote of 7–2 in Flowers v. Mississippi. The Supreme Court's decision was made based on the argument that the prosecutor, Doug Evans, had committed a Batson violation by striking all but one prospective black juror in Flowers's sixth trial. Justice Brett Kavanaugh wrote the majority decision:

The state's relentless, determined effort to rid the jury of black individuals strongly suggests that the state wanted to try Flowers before a jury with as few black jurors as possible, and ideally before an all-white jury. We cannot ignore that history.

Justices Neil Gorsuch and Clarence Thomas dissented from the Court's decision.

The Washington Post described Evans as conducting "a prosecutorial pursuit that may be without parallel". In total in the six trials, Evans had used 41 of 42 challenges to exclude African Americans from the juries.

== Resolution of case ==
Flowers continued to be held at Parchman, then at the Grenada County, Mississippi, jail, and the Winston-Chickasaw Regional Correctional Facility, in Louisville, Mississippi, pending decisions from prosecutors and the local court on any future prosecution. Flowers's attorneys petitioned for the charges to be dismissed, or failing that, for bail to be granted and for Doug Evans to be removed from any role in the prosecution, citing the multiple findings of prosecutorial misconduct in the case.

Evans was sued in federal court by the local NAACP chapter on behalf of multiple Flowers jury pool members, seeking class action status to include all jury-eligible black residents of his district, based on his alleged systematic racial discrimination in jury selection. This suit was later dismissed on procedural grounds.

On December 16, 2019, Judge Loper granted Flowers bail in the amount of $250,000, of which he was required to deposit 10 percent. Flowers was restricted to his residence, and required to wear an ankle monitor. Judge Loper noted in his decision that several of the prosecution's key witnesses had recanted. In addition, the podcast In the Dark reported that potentially exculpatory evidence had been uncovered, as well as alternative suspects, seemingly leaving the prosecution with a weaker case than in the previous trials.

Judge Loper reprimanded Evans, who was expected to but did not attend the hearing, for taking no action over the preceding four months to further Flowers's case despite court orders to do so. District Attorney Evans, prosecutor in all six of Flowers's trials, recused himself from the case in January 2020 and asked the presiding judge to turn over prosecution to the Mississippi Attorney General's office. The state declined to prosecute Flowers for the seventh time, officially dropping all charges against Flowers on September 4, 2020. The Attorney General's office stated that it would be nearly impossible to convict Flowers due to the lack of any available living witnesses who had not recanted or otherwise rendered their testimony unusable by making multiple conflicting statements, the identification of alternative suspects, and new potentially-exculpatory evidence. The case was dismissed with prejudice, barring further prosecution and thus freeing Flowers and bringing the case to a formal conclusion.

== Death ==
Flowers's body was found on October 7, 2026. He was 56. An October 8 New York Times obituary stated that he had died that week at home in Winona, Mississippi.
