= Stephen Bright =

American lawyer

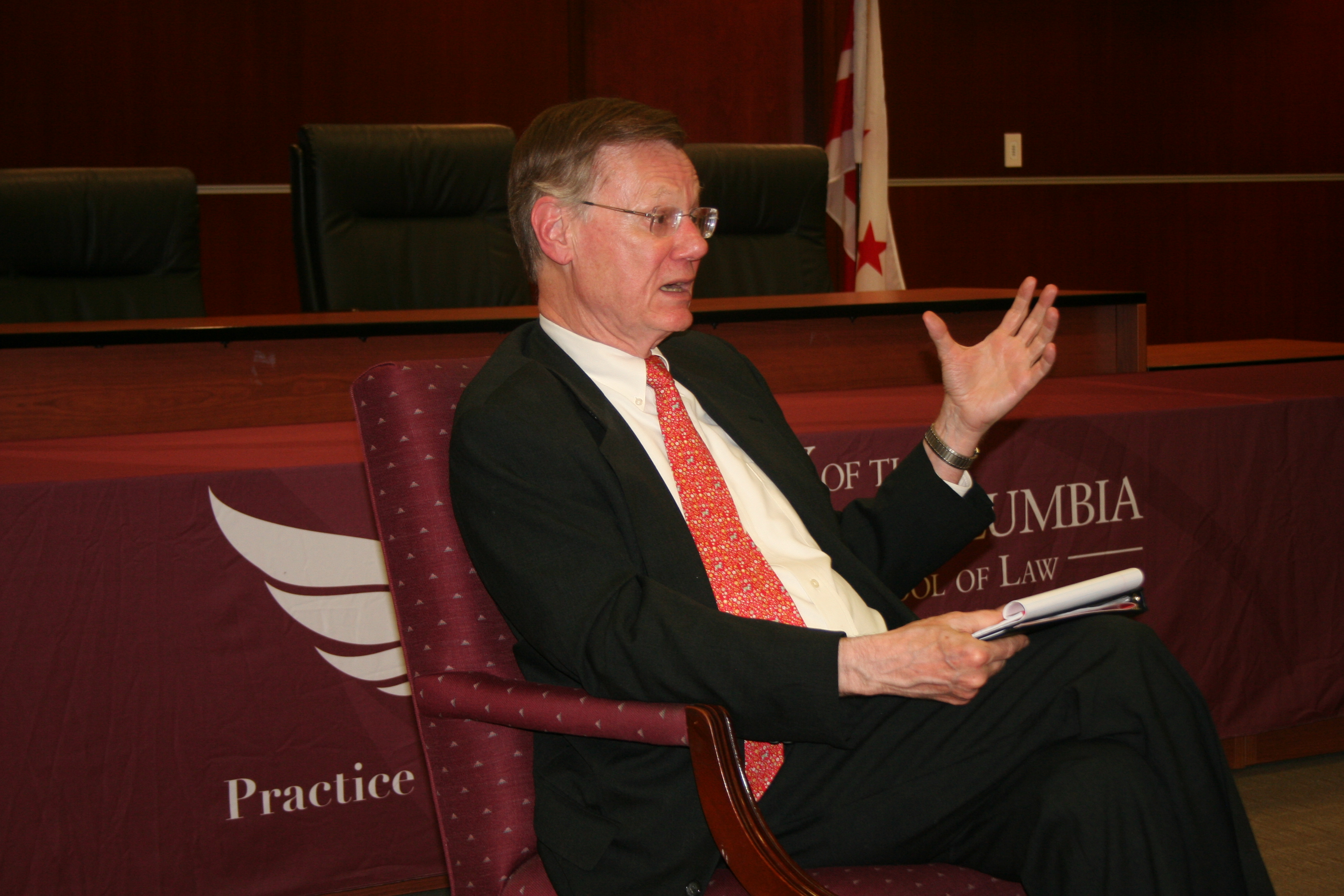
- Bright lectures at the David A. Clarke School of Law in November 2017

Personal details
- Born: 1948 (age 77–78) Boyle County, Kentucky, U.S.
- Education: University of Kentucky (BA, JD)

Stephen B. Bright (born 1948) is an American lawyer known for representing people facing the death penalty, advocating for the right to counsel for poor people accused of crimes, and challenging inhumane practices and conditions in prisons and jails. He has taught at Yale Law School since 1993 and has been teaching at the Georgetown Law Center since 2017 (it is his third visit to Georgetown). In 2016, he ended almost 35 years at the Southern Center for Human Rights in Atlanta, first as director from 1982 to 2005, and then as president and senior counsel from 2006 to 2016.

== Early life and education ==
Bright grew up on a family farm in Boyle County, Kentucky. As a student at Boyle County High School, he was a journalist, writing stories for The Advocate-Messenger. He began his undergraduate studies at the University of Kentucky (UK) in Lexington in fall 1965. He became involved with student government, switched his major from journalism to political science, and was elected student body president in 1970. Entering that office in a turbulent time of student demonstrations against the Vietnam War, the outspoken and controversial Bright earned a reputation as UK's "first liberal activist student president." He received his B.A. and J.D. degrees from the University of Kentucky.

== Legal career ==
Bright served as a legal services attorney with the Appalachian Research & Defense Fund from 1975 to 1976, a public defender with the Public Defender Service for the District of Columbia from 1976 to 1979, and director of a law school clinical program in Washington, D.C., from 1979 to 1982.

He has represented people facing the death penalty at trials and on appeals, and prisoners in challenges to inhumane conditions and practices; written essays and articles on the right to counsel, racial discrimination in the criminal legal system, judicial independence, and other topics, which have been published in scholarly publications, books, magazines and newspapers; and testified before committees of both the U.S. Senate and House of Representatives.

In addition to Yale and Georgetown, he has also taught at the law schools at Harvard University, University of Chicago, Emory University, University of Georgia, Georgia State University Law School, University of Tennessee, Northeastern University, American University, and other universities.

The Fulton County Daily Report named Bright as 'Agitator (and Newsmaker) of the Year' in 2003 for his contribution to bringing about creation of a public defender system in Georgia by bringing lawsuits and issuing reports that led to the state legislature's passage of the Georgia Indigent Defense Act.

Bright has argued before the Supreme Court in the cases of McWilliams v. Dunn (2017), Foster v. Chatman (2016), Snyder v. Louisiana (2008), and Amadeo v. Zant (1988). The Supreme Court ruled in favor of his clients in each case, finding racial discrimination in jury selection in the cases of Foster, Snyder and Amadeo, and the denial of funds for an crucial expert witness that denied McWilliams a fair trial.

== Works ==
In 2023, Bright co-authored, with James Kwak the book The Fear of Too Much Justice: Race, Poverty, and the Persistence of Inequality in the Criminal Courts (ISBN 978-1620970256)

== Representation in other media ==
- His work and the work of the Center have been the subject of a documentary film, Fighting for Life in the Death Belt
- Two books about their work are Proximity to Death by William S. McFeely (Norton, 1999) and Finding Life on Death Row by Katya Lezin (Northeastern University Press, 1999).

== Honors ==
- National Association of Criminal Defense Lawyers' Lifetime Achievement Award in 2008
- Inducted into the University of Kentucky College of Law Hall of Fame.
- American Bar Association's Thurgood Marshall Award in 1998
- American Civil Liberties Union's Roger Baldwin Medal of Liberty in 1991
- National Legal Aid & Defender Association's Kutak-Dodds Prize in 1992
- Human Rights Award, Death Penalty Focus (2011)

He has received honorary degrees from Georgetown, Emory, Northeastern, Louisville and Quinnipiac universities, the University of Kentucky, Centre College, Berea College, the University of Central England, and the John Jay College of Criminal Justice, and other awards.
