= Miller-El v. Dretke =

- Supreme Court of the United States

Argued December 6, 2004 Decided June 13, 2005
- Full case name: Miller-El v. Dretke, Director, Texas Department of Criminal Justice, Correctional Institutions Divisions
- Citations: 545 U.S. 231 (more) 125 S. Ct. 2317; 162 L. Ed. 2d 196; 2005 U.S. LEXIS 4658; 73 U.S.L.W. 4479; 18 Fla. L. Weekly Fed. S 376

Case history
- Prior: 361 F.3d 849 (5th Cir. 2004); cert. granted, 542 U.S. 936 (2004).

Holding
- The prosecution in the capital trial of Miller-El violated the Fourteenth Amendment as interpreted in Batson v. Kentucky when it racially discriminated against black potential jurors, and Miller-El is entitled to habeas corpus relief.

Court membership
- Chief Justice William Rehnquist Associate Justices John P. Stevens · Sandra Day O'Connor; Antonin Scalia · Anthony Kennedy; David Souter · Clarence Thomas; Ruth Bader Ginsburg · Stephen Breyer

Case opinions
- Majority: Souter, joined by Stevens, O'Connor, Kennedy, Ginsburg, Breyer
- Concurrence: Breyer
- Dissent: Thomas, joined by Rehnquist, Scalia

Laws applied
- U.S. Const. amend. XIV

Miller-El v. Dretke, 545 U.S. 231 (2005), is a United States Supreme Court case that clarified the constitutional limitations on the use by prosecutors of peremptory challenges and of the Texas procedure termed the "jury shuffle."

== Background ==
Thomas Miller-El was charged with capital murder committed in the course of a robbery. After voir dire, Miller-El moved to strike the entire jury because the prosecution had used its peremptory challenges to strike ten of the eleven African-Americans who were eligible to serve on the jury. This motion was denied, and Miller-El was subsequently found guilty and sentenced to death.

== Opinion of the Court ==
In 1986, the Supreme Court ruled in Batson v. Kentucky that a prosecutor's use of peremptory challenges may not be used to exclude jurors on the basis of race. Miller-El appealed based on the Batson criteria and asked that his conviction be overturned. In June 2005, the Supreme Court ruled 6–3 to overturn Miller-El's death sentence, finding his jury selection process had been tainted by racial bias.

The Court had held in Batson that a defendant could rely on "all relevant circumstances" in making out a prima facie case of purposeful discrimination. Miller-El clarified that "all relevant circumstances" included evidence outside "the four corners of the case." Specifically, the Court allowed statistical analysis of the venire, side-by-side comparison of struck and empaneled jurors, disparate questioning, and evidence of historical discrimination.

In 2008, Miller-El pleaded guilty to the 1985 murder of Douglas Walker, a Holiday Inn clerk who had been bound, gagged, then shot to death. The murder of Walker was the crime that Miller-El was originally sent to death row for.

The Court extended the holding of Miller-El in Snyder v. Louisiana.
