= Southern Center for Human Rights =

U.S. non-profit organization

- Founded at: Atlanta, Georgia
- Type: non-profit organization
- Purpose: civil and human rights
- Location(s): Georgia; Alabama; South Carolina
- Key people: Stephen Bright (former director and president)
- Website: www.schr.org

The Southern Center for Human Rights is a non-profit public interest law firm dedicated to enforcing the civil and human rights of people in the criminal justice system in the South. Based in Atlanta, Georgia, it has won cases in several states in the southeastern United States, including Georgia, Alabama, and South Carolina.

The Center’s legal work includes representing prisoners in challenges to unconstitutional conditions and practices in prisons and jails; challenging systemic failures in the legal representation of poor people in the criminal courts; and representing people facing death penalty who otherwise would have no representation. Alabama is the only state that does not provide legal representation to people on death row.

The Center's former director and president, Stephen Bright, was lauded in 2001 by Nat Hentoff in the Village Voice. In May 2004, the Center was highlighted in a New York Times op-ed piece which compared treatment of prisoners in Georgia to abuse of prisoners at Abu Ghraib prison in Iraq.

== Sources ==
- Alexander, Michelle. The New Jim Crow: Mass Incarceration in the Age of Colorblindness. New Press: New York, 2010.
- Bach, Amy. Ordinary Injustice: How America Holds Court. Metropolitan Books, New York, 2009. ISBN 978-0-8050-7447-5
- Cole, David. No Equal Justice: Race and Class in the American Criminal Justice System. New Press: New York, 1999.
- Stevenson, Bryan. Cruel and Unusual: Sentencing 13- and 14-Year-Old Children to Die in Prison. Montgomery, Ala.: Equal Justice Initiative, 2010.
- ———. Illegal Racial Discrimination in Jury Selection: A Continuing Legacy. Montgomery, Ala.: Equal Justice Initiative, 2010.
