= In the Dark (podcast) =

True crime podcast

- Genre: Investigative journalism; True crime
- Language: English

Cast and voices
- Hosted by: Madeleine Baran

Music
- Theme music composed by: Gary Meister

Production
- Production: Samara Freemark; The New Yorker; Condé Nast Entertainment

Technical specifications
- Audio format: Podcast (via streaming or downloadable MP3)

Publication
- No. of seasons: 3 (plus 4 limited-run special reports)
- No. of episodes: 46
- Original release: September 7, 2016
- Provider: American Public Media (2016–2022); The New Yorker (2023–present)
- Updates: Weekly

Reception
- Cited for: Peabody Award (2017, 2020)
- Cited as: "Transcending the [crime story] genre and advancing its scope of possibility" (2017) "Offering a master class in true-crime podcasting and in journalism that matters" (2020)

Related
- Website: www.newyorker.com/podcast/in-the-dark

In the Dark is an investigative journalism podcast hosted by Madeleine Baran, and produced by Samara Freemark, The New Yorker, and Condé Nast Entertainment. The series launched in September 2016 at American Public Media (APM), featuring in-depth reportage from APM's investigative reporting and documentary unit, APM Reports. Two full seasons were produced, each focusing on a high-profile case and the actions and conduct in the policing or prosecuting of those cases—the kidnapping/murder of Jacob Wetterling (Season 1) and the quadruple homicide case for which Curtis Flowers was tried 6 times (Season 2). A subsequent "Special Report" series, released in spring 2020, reported on the impact of the COVID-19 pandemic in the Mississippi Delta. The series was cancelled in May 2022 as part of APM's dissolving of APM Reports and "incorporating select programming elements" from the unit into its MPR News operation.

In March 2023, The New Yorker acquired the In the Dark library, and its team joined the magazine's staff to continue producing and distributing new episodes. A four-episode miniseries titled "The Runaway Princesses," about the attempted escape of Emirati princess Latifa bint Mohammed Al Maktoum, based on reporting from Heidi Blake, was released in January 2024. The series' third season, which examined the 2005 Haditha killings conducted by U.S. Marines, was released in July 2024, and won a 2024 Peabody Award, as well a 2025 Pulitzer Prize for Audio Reporting.

The podcast's fourth season, a six-part series investigating the 1985 Whitehouse Farm murder in Essex, England, began airing on October 28, 2025. Its fifth season, a five-part series investigating Mark Surrogacy, a surrogacy organization in Los Angeles that recruited women from around the country under suspicious pretenses, began airing on September 15, 2026.

== Origins and focus ==
In the Dark's hallmark is focusing not so much on a crime itself, but more on the behavior of law enforcement and prosecutors in their investigation of those crimes, as well as how such behavior affected the accused and their families, the victims' families, and surrounding communities. In discussing the show's first season with Esquire in November 2016, host/lead reporter Madeleine Baran noted that the APM team's "clear line of reporting" (her term) focused less on who kidnapped and murdered Jacob Wetterling, and instead more on how and why the crime went so long without resolution and the resulting impact. In comparison to other true crime podcasts (e.g. Serial) that attempt to investigate a crime, Baran told Esquire that the In the Dark was "not a mystery novel" and that APM Reports did not set out to play detective and solve the case, stating that "we saw ourselves as investigating the investigation."

The inspiration for In the Dark's title came from not only the time when Wetterling was kidnapped (just after 9:00 p.m. CDT on October 22, 1989) but also the lack of transparency by the Stearns County, Minnesota, Sheriff's Department in the case. As Baran put it to MPR News, "There's this crime that happened in the dark and, also, there's this investigation that happened in the dark."

== Series history ==
=== Season 1 ===
Season 1 of In the Dark explored the case of Jacob Wetterling, an 11-year-old boy from St. Joseph, Minnesota, who was kidnapped and murdered on the night of October 22, 1989. Wetterling's case went unsolved for 27 years until his remains were discovered in a pasture near Paynesville, Minnesota on September 1, 2016. The location was revealed by Danny Heinrich, a long-time person of interest in the abduction of another boy, Jared Scheierl, in the nearby town of Cold Spring. On September 6, 2016, Heinrich admitted to kidnapping and murdering Wetterling as well as the abduction and sexual assault of Scheierl. Heinrich was sentenced on November 21, 2016, to a 20-year prison term for a federal child pornography charge.

Production on Season 1 had been underway for 9 months and was in its final stages (it was scheduled to premiere on September 13, 2016) by the time Wetterling's remains were discovered and Heinrich confessed to the crime. The developments, which host/lead reporter Madeleine Baran and the APM Reports team were not expecting ahead of time, prompted them to re-edit and re-record the first two episodes (at least the first of which was already finished) and move up their release to September 7, one day after Heinrich's court appearance.

The edits to the first two episodes of In the Dark turned out to be minimal, for by then, the reporting team's focus wasn't so much about who may have been responsible for Jacob Wetterling's disappearance but more about the investigation of the crime and its effects on the community. The team focused on systemic failures in the Wetterling investigation, in particular how the Stearns County Sheriff's Office handled not only the case but other similar cases.

In addition to examining the actions of the Stearns County Sheriff's Office, broader repercussions of the Wetterling case were also explored, including the impact on Jacob's family and friends (Jacob's parents, Jerry and Patty Wetterling, were extensively featured); its effect on the immediate Stearns County area; and national implications, including the establishment of a federal law, named in Jacob's honor, that requires states to implement and contribute to registries that track sex offenders and crimes against children.

==== Episode summary ====
As indicated above, the release dates of In the Dark's first two episodes were initially scheduled for a September 13, 2016, release date. The developments that led to Danny Heinrich's confession in the Jacob Wetterling case prompted APM to re-record those episodes and release them on September 7, six days earlier than scheduled. The third episode was released on September 13, with one new episode released each Tuesday thru October 25. Follow-up episodes were released in December 2016 and September 2018.

No.	Title	Length (minutes:seconds)	Original release date
1	"The Crime"	34:46	September 7, 2016
A look at the Jacob Wetterling abduction itself, as well as early actions by the Stearns County Sheriff's Office that would hobble their investigation for decades to come.
2	"The Circle"	38:29	September 7, 2016
How investigators, rather than start in small circles, allowed the case to grow into a statewide and eventually national concern.
3	"The One Who Got Away"	44:49	September 13, 2016
Jared Scheierl recalls his January 1989 assault by Danny Heinrich, as well as his efforts to investigate his own case (which Heinrich wouldn't confess to until decades later).
4	"The Circus"	36:34	September 20, 2016
The Wetterling case gains national attention, as everyone from national journalists to talk show hosts to psychics get involved. Meanwhile, local investigators entertain farfetched vagaries.
5	"Person of Interest"	47:30	September 27, 2016
Twenty-one years after Jacob's disappearance, police declare local music teacher Dan Rassier a person of interest; their actions produce no evidence, yet ruin Rassier's reputation.
6	"Stranger Danger"	36:47	October 4, 2016
A look at how the Wetterling case, and other preceding and subsequent high-profile cases, created a national sense of worry over "pedophiles lurking around every corner"; such fear resulted in the establishment of sex offender registries that Patty Wetterling believes may have gone too far.
7	"This Quiet Place"	40:34	October 11, 2016
How a "lack of introspection and accountability" led to several unsolved cases in the Stearns County Sheriff's Office backlog, including cases that occurred long before Jacob's disappearance... and that state investigators solved by asking questions the Sheriff's Office did not.
8	"What's Going On Down There?"	46:06	October 18, 2016
A focus on accountability (or lack therof) in the Stearns County Sheriff's Office in particular and other sheriff's offices nationally, as it is revealed that Stearns County has a very low clearance rate in investigating serious cases such as murder.
9	"The Truth"	42:00	October 25, 2016
A profile of Danny Heinrich and how the wrong moves of the Stearns County Sheriff's Office allowed him to go free — and commit other crimes.
10	"Update: Sentencing, A Demand, No Closure"	36:36	December 2, 2016
In this follow-up, Madeleine Baran recounts the sentencing hearing for Danny Heinrich, speaks one more time with Jerry & Patty Wetterling, and reports on Dan Rassier's plans to sue the Stearns County Sheriff's Office over his being wrongfully implicated in the Wetterling case.
11	"Season 1 Update: The Wetterling File"	28:05	September 21, 2018
This update comes one day after a file into the Wetterling case (over 41,000 pages in size) is released by Stearns County. As a very critical Don Gudmundson, who became sheriff in May 2017, admits in a press conference, "All of us [in law enforcement] failed."

=== Season 2 ===
The second season of In the Dark explored the legal odyssey surrounding Curtis Flowers, who was accused of shooting four people to death inside Tardy Furniture, a Winona, Mississippi, store, in July 1996. Flowers, who had worked at Tardy Furniture for only a few days and who had long maintained his innocence, faced trial for the murders six times. The first five of those trials resulted in either hung juries or reversals on appeal. A sixth jury trial, in 2010, ended with Flowers' conviction on four counts of capital murder, but the United States Supreme Court remanded the case to a lower court to review racial bias in jury selection. After Mississippi's Supreme Court upheld Flowers' conviction by a 5–4 vote, Flowers once again went to the U.S. Supreme Court, who heard oral arguments on the appeal in March 2019, and ruled, by a 7–2 decision on June 21, 2019, to overturn his conviction and send the case back to the lower courts. Flowers was moved from death row that September, and released on bail the following December. The Mississippi Attorney General's office reviewed the case and moved to dismiss the indictment against him with prejudice; a judge granted the motion on September 4, 2020.

While the APM Reports team never set out to prove Flowers' guilt or innocence, the investigation featured in In the Dark was credited with alerting the public and turning the case around. Indeed, much as with how its first season focused on the conduct of those investigating Jacob Wetterling's disappearance, Season 2's storyline—which began with an e-mail tip to APM Reports and led to a nearly year-long investigation—pivoted from the murders Flowers had been tried and convicted for to the conduct of the district attorney's office in Mississippi's Fifth Circuit Court District. Actions by two figures in the D.A.'s office are specified, D.A. Doug Evans (who prosecuted Flowers and expressed certainty of his guilt) and office investigator John Johnson (lead investigator in the Tardy Furniture case).

In its investigation of Flowers' case for In the Dark's 2nd season, the APM team revealed four noteworthy actions by the D.A.'s office that appeared to ensure Flowers' conviction, actions were mentioned in the state's motion to dismiss:

- The consideration, by Evans and Johnson, of Flowers as the only suspect in the Tardy Furniture murders.
- The reliance on a key prosecution witness, Odell Hallmon, whose testimony that he heard Flowers confess to the murders turned out to be a falsehood.
- The revelation, in the season's 10th episode, that Evans' office withheld from defense attorneys the fact that an "alternative suspect," Willie James Hemphill, was held for questioning in the case. Flowers' legal team cited this revelation in their June 2018 appeal to the Supreme Court of Mississippi.
- The efforts by Evans to empanel all-white or majority-white juries against Flowers (who is African American), and striking as many Black jurors from jury consideration as possible. It is this aspect that the U.S. Supreme Court cited in its June 2019 decision to overturn Flowers' conviction.

In addition to examining Flowers' case, In the Dark's second season profiled Curtis' family. Historical anecdotes about racial issues in Winona (which has a majority Black population) and northern Mississippi were also incorporated.

The second season of In the Dark was the first podcast to receive a George Polk Award, one of the highest honors in journalism, in 2018.

==== Episode summary ====
Season 2 of In the Dark began with the release of its first two episodes on May 1, 2018, with one new episode being released each Tuesday through, initially, July 3, 2018. Later developments in the Flowers were covered by additional episodes, the last of which (an interview with Curtis Flowers himself) was released on October 14, 2020.

No.	Title	Length (hours:minutes:seconds)	Original release date
1	"July 16, 1996"	42:22	May 1, 2018
A look at the day of the murders at Tardy Furniture, Curtis Flowers' personal background, and the first of six trials against him.
2	"The Route"	52:39	May 1, 2018
Conversations with the witnesses who said they saw Flowers walking through downtown Winona the morning of the murders, and how and why some of their stories now waver on key details.
3	"The Gun"	47:03	May 8, 2018
The strange story of the man whose stolen gun investigators allege was used in the murders — even though it has never been found and may not have been the actual murder weapon.
4	"The Confessions"	52:55	May 15, 2018
How three jail inmates claimed they heard Flowers confess to the murders, whether their stories have any veracity, and whether the prosecution and investigators had any influence in their testimony.
5	"Privilege"	48:14	May 22, 2018
The focus turns to Odell Hallmon, a career criminal and the jailhouse witness the District Attorney's office relied on the most. D.A. Doug Evans' zeal to retain Hallmon as a witness against Flowers helped Hallman stay out of jail and become, as one law enforcement veteran put it, a "monster."
6	"Punishment"	43:48	May 29, 2018
Now serving three consecutive life sentences without parole for a 2016 murder spree, Odell Hallmon surreptitiously reaches out to APM and makes an admission: His trial testimony against Flowers (in exchange for Doug Evans granting leniency for his own crimes) was a fabrication. The status of Flowers' appeal is profiled, as is the emotional toll his family and friends feel over his imprisonment.
7	"The Trials of Curtis Flowers"	1:01:08	June 5, 2018
Examining the makeup of the juries in Flowers' trials, a pattern is revealed: The juries who convicted Flowers were all white or had only one juror of color, the result of D.A. Doug Evans seeking to use as many "strikes" as possible to seat as many white jurors as possible. Also examined is the plight of James Bibbs, a Black juror in the 5th trial whose doubts about Flowers' guilt prompted a mistrial — and led to his own indictment, for perjury.
8	"The D.A."	1:01:30	June 12, 2018
Before Madeleine Baran's brief interview with Doug Evans (during which he is noncommittal and holds to his belief of Flowers' guilt), a profile of Evans' background and rise to D.A. is featured, as is his office's history of disproportionately striking more Blacks than whites for juries even outside of the trials against Flowers.
9	"Why Curtis?"	56:32	June 19, 2018
Why did the D.A.'s investigation focus exclusively on Flowers? A look into John Johnson's background reveals an investigation based on uneasy feelings Tardy Furniture employees had for Flowers, an incident involving damaged golf cart batteries, failed attempts to get a recorded confession, and notes containing statements witnesses say weren't entirely true or were completely made up.
10	"Discovery"	1:04:04	June 26, 2018
It is revealed that the prosecution withheld from Flowers' attorneys evidence that could have benefited Flowers' defense. A search of county records in a musty warehouse reveals that another person was questioned in the Tardy Furniture murders. That person, Willie James Hemphill, admits to APM that authorities held him as a suspect and collected evidence on him.
11	"The End"	35:22	July 3, 2018
Winona resident Jeffrey Armstrong offers two revelations that suggest someone else may have committed the murders: His 2001 finding and turnover to Winona Police of a firearm similar to the one used at Tardy Furniture (which the state has no record of), and a path from where the gun was found to the store's location that is in the opposite direction of Flowers' alleged route. An update on Flowers' appeal is offered, as are thoughts from his parents.
12	"Season 2 Update: Back to Winona"	33:43	September 18, 2018
Two months, and a lot has happened: APM's investigation has Winona talking, though opinions remain divided along racial lines. Jeffrey Armstrong and his family have gone into hiding, Jeffrey's personal safety threatened after his Episode 11 revelations. Doug Evans has not faced sanction, but interest in filing complaints against the D.A. have percolated. And Curtis Flowers remains incarcerated, not receiving permission to attend his mother's funeral.
13	"Season 2 Update: SCOTUS Takes the Case"	9:50	November 2, 2018
A quick update offers important news on Flowers' fate: The U.S. Supreme Court has granted his writ of certiorari and will hear arguments on whether his conviction should be upheld or overturned.
14	"Season 2 Update: Q&A + A Fire in Winona"	1:04:59	November 27, 2018
Madeleine Baran and senior producer Samara Freemark field listeners' questions about the Flowers case. They also offer an update on Pastor Nelson Forrest, whose house was gutted by fire 4 days after eulogizing Curtis' mother; the timing of the fire is seen by some Winona residents as possible retribution for Forrest's outspokenness about Curtis' defense.
15	"Before the Court"	40:55	March 19, 2019
A preview of oral arguments in Flowers' appeal before the U.S. Supreme Court and a look at the allegations at the heart of the appeal: Doug Evans' attempts to keep African Americans off the jury in Flowers' 6th trial.
16	"Oral Arguments"	47:06	March 26, 2019
Reports from inside the U.S. Supreme Court and analysis on the High Court's hearing of oral arguments in Flowers' appeal.
17	"The Decision"	15:04	June 21, 2019
An update posted hours after the U.S. Supreme Court's decision examines their throwing out Flowers' 6th conviction (on grounds that the trial court committed errors in striking Black jurors), and what comes next now that the case has been remanded to lower courts.
18	"Revelations"	56:16	July 2, 2019
A look at major developments since the U.S. Supreme Court's decision, including the recanting of a second major witness against Flowers and the whereabouts of Willie James Hemphill on the day of the murders.
19	"A Hearing"	47:51	December 16, 2019
A recap of the hearing when Flowers released on bail, 23 years after first being incarcerated for the Tardy Furniture murders.
20	"Home"	42:27	December 22, 2019
Flowers' release from jail, in time for Christmas, brings joy to his family — a feeling not all in Winona mutually feel. A look at the about face by the judge who granted Flowers bail — and also presided over Flowers' two most recent trials.
21	"The Recusal"	18:00	January 6, 2020
What happens in the Flowers case now that Doug Evans voluntarily recused himself from future involvement in the matter.
22	"Freedom"	17:49	September 4, 2020
A report on that day's big decision from Mississippi's Attorney General: After 24 years and 6 trials, and citing "facts and circumstances in the case," the state drops all charges against Curtis Flowers in the Tardy Furniture murders — making Curtis a free man at last.
23	"Curtis Flowers"	1:02:46	October 14, 2020
During its 3-year investigation, APM Reports had access to lawyers, witnesses, jurors, family members, investigators, politicians, and residents of Winona... but was never granted permission to talk with Curtis Flowers. With Curtis now cleared of all charges in the Tardy Furniture murders, Madeleine Baran at long last has a sit-down interview with the man himself.

=== Special Report: Coronavirus in the Delta ===
In spring 2020, In the Dark returned to Mississippi for a limited-run special report. Rather than focus solely on matters of crime or jurisprudence, the special series instead examined the effects of the COVID-19 coronavirus pandemic on rural America, in particular the Mississippi Delta. Six episodes, released between April and June 2020, were included in the special report.

No.	Title	Length (minutes:seconds)	Original release date
1	"Greenville"	40:47	April 30, 2020
Greenville's mayor issues an order prohibiting drive-in church services, raising the ire of two Baptist pastors and creating a firestorm in conservative media.
2	"Parchman"	30:31	May 6, 2020
A look at fears of COVID-19 by inmates of the Mississippi State Penitentiary (often referred to as Parchman), a location where they cannot readily self-isolate to counter the virus' spread.
3	"The Hospital"	29:33	May 14, 2020
The staff of Greenwood's Leflore Hospital brace for the pandemic and an influx of patients. Then the virus strikes one of their own.
4	"Watermelon Slim"	20:58	May 21, 2020
Bill Homans, better known as Watermelon Slim, looks at the pandemic's impact on his livelihood (performing blues music) and the lives of those around him.
5	"Geno"	32:59	May 28, 2020
As a precaution against the virus' spread, a judge in Indianola orders every inmate in the local jail released — except for Geno McShane, who was kept incarcerated after his arrest for shoplifting.
6	"Delta State"	29:46	June 11, 2020
Members of Delta State University's football team struggle to find structure and purpose in a COVID-impacted offseason.

=== The Runaway Princesses ===
Following the acquisition of In the Dark's staff and library by The New Yorker, the podcast relaunched with a miniseries titled "The Runaway Princesses", that tracked the attempted escape of Emirati princess Latifa bint Mohammed Al Maktoum and its aftermath, based on previous reporting from Heidi Blake. Episodes were released to New Yorker subscribers one week early and ad-free, exclusively on the magazine's website and mobile app, before airing to the public via other podcatchers.

No.	Title	Length (minutes:seconds)	Original release date
1	"Sisters"	38:27	January 30, 2024
2	"Escape"	43:50	February 6, 2024
3	"A Nice Lunch"	32:13	February 13, 2024
4	"Hostage"	45:33	February 20, 2024

=== Season 3 ===
The series' third season, which examined the 2005 Haditha killings conducted by U.S. Marines, began releasing episodes in July 2024.

No.	Title	Length (minutes:seconds)	Original release date
1	"The Green Grass"	42:29	July 30, 2024
2	"I Have Questions"	35:16	July 30, 2024
3	"Sounds Like Murder"	40:30	August 6, 2024
4	"What They Saw"	52:36	August 13, 2024
5	"Four Brothers"	58:27	August 20, 2024
6	"The Full Picture"	56:18	August 27, 2024
7	"Innocent In My Eyes"	45:33	August 27, 2024
8	"On Trial"	63:00	September 10, 2024
9	"Patient #8"	50:27	September 17, 2024

=== Blood Relatives ===
In 2025, the series released "Blood Relatives", a six-part series investigating the 1985 Whitehouse Farm murder in Essex, England, and partnering with New Yorker staff writer Heidi Blake, with the first episode released on October 28, 2025. Subscribers to the magazine were given immediate access to all six episodes via the mobile app and Apple Podcasts; non-subscribers received the first two episodes on all podcatchers on the same date, with the rest airing weekly.

No.	Title	Length (minutes:seconds)	Original release date
1	"Episode 1"	45:20	October 28, 2025
2	"Episode 2"	54:26	October 28, 2025
3	"Episode 3"	50:33	November 4, 2025
4	"Episode 4"	45:32	November 11, 2025
5	"Episode 5"	40:16	November 18, 2025
6	"Episode 6"	46:04	November 25, 2025

=== The Journey ===
In September 2026, In the Dark will release "The Journey", a five-part series investigating Mark Surrogacy, a surrogacy organization that recruited women around the U.S. to bear children under suspicious pretenses, and the couple behind the organization who kept twenty-one children in a Los Angeles mansion, occasionally subjecting them to physical abuse. Hosted by New Yorker staff writer Ava Kofman, and based on her reporting, the first episode was released on September 15, 2026. Subscribers to the magazine were given immediate ad-free access to all five episodes via the New Yorker mobile app and Apple Podcasts; non-subscribers received the first episode on all podcatchers on the same date, with the rest airing weekly.

No.	Title	Length (minutes:seconds)	Original release date
1	"Episode 1: Gifts"	54:04	September 15, 2026
2	"Episode 2: Intended Parents"	53:11	September 22, 2026
3	"Episode 3: The Industry"	53:20	September 29, 2026
4	"Episode 4: The Courts"	50:26	October 6, 2026
5	"Episode 5: The Children"	51:11	October 13, 2026

== Awards ==
In 2019, In the Dark was the first podcast to ever receive a George Polk Award.

In the Dark is a three-time recipient of the Peabody Award. The show's first Peabody honor came in spring 2017, with the award's governing body applauding the program for its "immaculate storytelling talent and journalistic precision" in its probing the investigation of Jacob Wetterling's disappearance as well as its "deftly incisive" way of telling the human side of the case and its broader policy implications. The second Peabody came in June 2020, recognizing the show's work in not only "systemically dismantl[ing]" (the jury's term) the case against Curtis Flowers, but also building a case against the District Attorney who prosecuted Flowers, and recognizing those who have lived under the shadow of the case.

In the Dark's third Peabody award, and the first under New Yorker stewardship, for a series on the 2005 massacre of Iraqi civilians by U.S. Marines, recognized the show's "unrelenting exploration of how the United States' forever wars have devastated generations abroad but been pardoned at home."

The third season of In the Dark was also the recipient of the 2025 Pulitzer Prize for Audio Reporting, the first for the podcast, and the eleventh for the New Yorker since magazines became eligible for the awards.

Award	Year	Category	Result	Ref.
Pulitzer Prize	2025	Audio Reporting	Won	
Peabody Awards	2016	Podcast & Radio	Won	
Peabody Awards	2019	Podcast & Radio	Won	
Peabody Awards	2024	Podcast & Radio	Won	
George Polk Award	2018	Podcast	Won	
Academy of Podcasters Awards	2017	Best News and Politics Podcast	Won	
iHeartRadio Podcast Awards	2019	Best Crime Podcast	Nominated	

== See also ==
- List of American crime podcasts
