= Trial consulting =

Trial consulting is the use of social scientists, particularly psychologists and communication experts, and economists, to aid attorneys in the presentation of a criminal trial or civil lawsuit. Modern trial consultants help prepare witnesses, improve arguments and rhetoric, hold focus groups and mock trials, complete change of venue surveys, and select juries.

== Overview ==
Traditionally sophisticated jury selection methods were a mainstay of trial consultants, they now "place far less emphasis on jury selection than they did in the past", and many in the field now prefer the term "trial consulting" to "jury consulting". Since many cases are now settled out of court or decided by arbitration, some trial consulting firms have diversified to include mock mediation and arbitration sessions. This is also the reason that many jury/trial consultants are now referring to themselves as "litigation consultants".

The traditional mainstays of trial consulting remain important. They include witness preparation, shadow juries, mock trials, focus groups, community attitude surveys, and expert assistance with trial presentation.

== In fiction ==
- Bull (2016 TV series)
