= Georgia v. McCollum =

- Supreme Court of the United States

Argued February 26, 1992 Decided June 18, 1992
- Full case name: Georgia, Petitioner v. Thomas McCollum, William Joseph McCollum and Ella Hampton McCollum
- Citations: 505 U.S. 42 (more) 112 S. Ct. 2348; 120 L. Ed. 2d 33

Holding
- The Constitution prohibits a criminal defendant from engaging in purposeful discrimination on the ground of race in the exercise of peremptory challenges.

Court membership
- Chief Justice William Rehnquist Associate Justices Byron White · Harry Blackmun; John P. Stevens · Sandra Day O'Connor; Antonin Scalia · Anthony Kennedy; David Souter · Clarence Thomas

Case opinions
- Majority: Blackmun, joined by Rehnquist, White, Stevens, Kennedy, Souter
- Concurrence: Rehnquist
- Concurrence: Thomas
- Dissent: O'Connor
- Dissent: Scalia

Laws applied
- U.S. Const. amend. XIV

Georgia v. McCollum, 505 U.S. 42 (1992), was a case in which the Supreme Court of the United States held that a criminal defendant cannot make peremptory challenges based solely on race. The court had previously held in Batson v. Kentucky (1986) that prosecutors cannot make peremptory challenges based on race, but did not address whether defendants could use them. The court had already ruled in Edmonson v. Leesville Concrete Company (1991) that the Batson prohibition also applies to civil litigants because they are state actors during the jury selection process.

However, in Polk County v. Dodson, the court had held that a public defender is not a state actor in the context of a lawsuit for inadequate legal representation. McCollum argued that Polk County was the controlling precedent, so public defenders are not state actors during jury selection. Writing for the court, Justice Harry Blackmun disagreed. Blackmun found that whether a public defender is a state actor "depends on the nature and context of the function he is performing." Just as he is a state actor in the context of personnel decisions like hiring and firing attorneys in his office, a public defender is a state actor in the context of peremptory challenges. Like in Edmonson, Blackmun found that race-based peremptory challenges by the defendant violate the Equal Protection Clause and are therefore unconstitutional.

McCollum was the first case in which the Supreme Court referred to Black people with the term "African American."
