= Swain v. Alabama =

- Supreme Court of the United States

Argued December 8, 1964 Decided March 8, 1965
- Full case name: Robert Swain v. Alabama
- Citations: 380 U.S. 202 (more) 85 S. Ct. 824; 13 L. Ed. 2d 759; 1965 U.S. LEXIS 1668

Holding
- The overall percentage disparity has been small and reflects no studied attempt to include or exclude a specified number of blacks.

Court membership
- Chief Justice Earl Warren Associate Justices Hugo Black · William O. Douglas; Tom C. Clark · John M. Harlan II; William J. Brennan Jr. · Potter Stewart; Byron White · Arthur Goldberg

Case opinions
- Majority: White, joined by Clark, Harlan, Brennan, Stewart
- Concurrence: Harlan
- Concurrence: Black
- Dissent: Goldberg, joined by Warren, Douglas
- Overruled by
- Batson v. Kentucky, 476 U.S. 79 (1986)

Swain v. Alabama, 380 U.S. 202 (1965), was a case heard before the United States Supreme Court regarding the legality of a struck jury.

== Background ==
Swain, a black man, was indicted and convicted of rape in the Circuit Court of Talladega County, Alabama, and sentenced to death by an all white jury. The case was appealed to the Supreme Court, in part, on the ground that there were no black jurors. Of eligible jurors in the county, 26% were black, but panels since 1953 averaged 10% to 15% black jurors and no black juror had actually served on a petit jury since 1950.

In Swain's case, 8 of the 100 empaneled jurors were black, but all were "struck" through peremptory challenges by the prosecution.

== Opinion of the Court ==
In a 6–3 decision, the Supreme Court affirmed the decision of the Alabama Supreme Court, holding that neither the racial disparity in jury pools nor the decade-long absence of any black juror to serve at trial presented evidence sufficient to "make out a prima facie case of invidious discrimination under the Fourteenth Amendment."

With regard to the historical under-representation of black jurors in Talladega County jury pools, the Majority held, "The overall percentage disparity has been small and reflects no studied attempt to include or exclude a specified number of Negros." Likewise, respecting the absence of black jurors at Swain's trial, the Court held that striking a juror solely on the basis of race did not violate the Fourteenth Amendment because "the question a prosecutor or defense counsel must decide is not whether a juror of a particular race or nationality is in fact partial, but whether one from a different group is less likely to be." Swain also contended that the absence of any black juror to serve at trial since 1950 showed invidious discrimination. Rejecting the argument, the Majority said, "even if a State's systematic striking of Negroes in the selection of petit juries raises a prima facie case under the Fourteenth Amendment, we think it is readily apparent that the record in this case is not sufficient to demonstrate that the rule has been violated by the peremptory system as it operates in Talladega County." On these grounds, the Supreme Court affirmed the decision of the Alabama Supreme Court, upholding Swain's death sentence.

Justice Goldberg authored a dissent which was joined by Justice Douglas and Chief Justice Warren.

== Subsequent developments ==
This case recognized the peremptory challenge as a valid legal practice so long as it was not used intentionally to exclude blacks from jury duties. The precedent set in this case was overturned in Batson v. Kentucky, 476 U.S. 79 (1986).

== See also ==
- List of United States Supreme Court cases, volume 380
