= J.E.B. v. Alabama ex rel. T.B. =

J. E. B. v. Alabama ex rel. T. B.
- Supreme Court of the United States

Argued November 2, 1993 Decided April 19, 1994
- Full case name: J. E. B., Petitioner v. Alabama ex rel. T. B.
- Citations: 511 U.S. 127 (more) 114 S.Ct. 1419; 128 L. Ed. 2d 89; 1994 U.S. LEXIS 3121; 62 USLW 4219; 64 Empl. Prac. Dec. (CCH) ¶ 42,967

Case history
- Prior: Certiorari to the Alabama Court of Civil Appeals 606 So.2d 156

Holding
- Intentional discrimination on the basis of gender by state actors in the use of peremptory strikes in jury selection violates the equal protection clause of the 14th Amendment.

Court membership
- Chief Justice William Rehnquist Associate Justices Harry Blackmun · John P. Stevens; Sandra Day O'Connor · Antonin Scalia; Anthony Kennedy · David Souter; Clarence Thomas · Ruth Bader Ginsburg

Case opinions
- Majority: Blackmun, joined by Stevens, O'Connor, Souter, Ginsburg
- Concurrence: O'Connor
- Concurrence: Kennedy
- Dissent: Rehnquist
- Dissent: Scalia, joined by Rehnquist, Thomas

Laws applied
- U.S. Const. amend. XIV

J. E. B. v. Alabama ex rel. T. B., 511 U.S. 127 (1994), is a landmark decision of the Supreme Court of the United States holding that peremptory challenges based solely on a prospective juror's sex are unconstitutional. J.E.B. extended the court's existing precedent in Batson v. Kentucky (1986), which found race-based peremptory challenges in criminal trials unconstitutional, and Edmonson v. Leesville Concrete Company (1991), which extended that principle to civil trials. As in Batson, the court found that sex-based challenges violate the Equal Protection Clause.

== Background ==
On behalf of T.B., the mother of a minor child, the state sued J.E.B. for child support in Jackson County, Alabama. During jury selection, challenges intentionally targeted male potential jurors resulting in an all-female jury.

== Decision ==
The majority opinion was written by Justice Blackmun. Justice O'Connor wrote a concurring opinion, and Justice Kennedy separately concurred in the judgment. Chief Justice Rehnquist filed a separate dissenting opinion. Justice Scalia also filed a dissenting opinion, which was joined by Chief Justice Rehnquist and Justice Thomas.

== See also ==
- Hoyt v. Florida (1961)
- List of United States Supreme Court cases, volume 511
- Lists of United States Supreme Court cases
- Lists of United States Supreme Court cases by volume
- List of United States Supreme Court cases by the Rehnquist Court
