= Snyder v. Louisiana =

- Supreme Court of the United States

Argued December 4, 2007 Decided March 19, 2008
- Full case name: Allen Snyder v. Louisiana
- Docket no.: 06-10119
- Citations: 552 U.S. 472 (more) 128 S. Ct. 1203; 170 L. Ed. 2d 175

Case history
- Prior: State v. Snyder, 942 So. 2d 484 (La. 2006); cert. granted, 551 U.S. 1144 (2007).

Holding
- Louisiana Supreme Court reversed and remanded

Court membership
- Chief Justice John Roberts Associate Justices John P. Stevens · Antonin Scalia; Anthony Kennedy · David Souter; Clarence Thomas · Ruth Bader Ginsburg; Stephen Breyer · Samuel Alito

Case opinions
- Majority: Alito, joined by Roberts, Stevens, Kennedy, Souter, Ginsburg, Breyer
- Dissent: Thomas, joined by Scalia

Laws applied
- Equal Protection Clause

Snyder v. Louisiana, 552 U.S. 472 (2008), was a United States Supreme Court case about racial issues in jury selection in death penalty cases. Justice Samuel Alito, writing for the 7–2 majority, ruled that the prosecutor's use of peremptory strikes to remove African American jurors violated the Court's earlier holding in Batson v. Kentucky. Justice Clarence Thomas dissented.

== Trial court ==
Allen Snyder was charged with first-degree murder in the August 1995 stabbing to death of Howard Wilson. The State of Louisiana sought the death penalty. Voir dire for the jury began on August 27, 1996. In accordance with Louisiana law, the parties were permitted to use their peremptory strikes up until the time when the final jury was sworn and thus were permitted to strike jurors whom they had initially accepted when the jurors’ panels were called. Eighty-five prospective jurors were questioned as members of a panel. Thirty-six of these potential jurors survived challenges for cause; five of the thirty-six were African American; and all five of the prospective black jurors were eliminated by the prosecution through the use of peremptory strikes. The jury found petitioner guilty and determined that he should receive the death penalty.

During the trial, the prosecutor kept referring to the O. J. Simpson murder case, implying that the defendant might get away with murder. He persisted even after the judge made him promise to stop in the middle of the trial. Outside of the court, he was referring to the case as his O.J. case. This behavior put more emphasis on his dismissal of every black juror as likely having a basis in race. One of the black juror candidates was recognized by the prosecution as friendly to the police, typically considered a valuable juror for the prosecution, but this candidate was likewise dismissed: another argument for racism in jury selection.

== Procedural history ==
Snyder appealed his conviction, arguing that under Batson v. Kentucky, the prosecution should not have been permitted to exercise its peremptory jury challenges based on race. The Louisiana Supreme Court conditionally affirmed petitioner’s conviction, rejecting petitioner’s Batson claim, but remanded the case for a nunc pro tunc determination of petitioner’s competency to stand trial. On remand, the trial court found that petitioner had been competent to stand trial, and the Louisiana Supreme Court affirmed that determination.

Snyder then petitioned the Supreme Court of the United States for a writ of certiorari. While Snyder's petition was pending, the U.S. Supreme Court decided Miller-El v. Dretke; as a result, they granted Snyder's petition, vacated the judgment, and remanded the case to the Louisiana Supreme Court for further consideration in light of Miller-El. On remand, the Louisiana Supreme Court again rejected Snyder’s Batson claim, this time by a vote of 4 to 3. The U.S. Supreme Court again granted certiorari.

== Decision ==
The question the Supreme Court posed to the parties was: Did the state's dismissal by peremptory challenge of all of the African American potential jurors amount to a violation of the Equal Protection Clause? Petitioner claimed that at least two of the African American jurors were struck from the jury for purely race-based reasons. Respondent claimed that the race-neutral reasons offered at voir dire were legitimate, and the trial court agreed. Petitioner argued that the trial court should have applied closer scrutiny to the respondent's reasoning.

Justice Samuel Alito, writing for the Court, concluded that the trial judge had acted improperly in allowing the prosecutor to peremptorily strike the African American jurors. Alito noted that the reasons given by the prosecution for striking the jurors applied equally well to the white jurors the prosecution did not strike.

Justice Clarence Thomas wrote a dissent, which Justice Scalia joined. Thomas wrote that the court improperly second-guessed the fact-based decisions of the trial court, and that a higher standard of deference ought to have been applied to the trial court's determinations.

== See also ==
- List of United States Supreme Court cases, volume 552
