= Edmonson v. Leesville Concrete Co. =

Edmonson v. Leesville Concrete Company
- Supreme Court of the United States

Argued January 15, 1991 Decided June 3, 1991
- Full case name: Edmonson v. Leesville Concrete Company
- Citations: 500 U.S. 614 (more) 111 S. Ct. 2077; 114 L. Ed. 2d 660; 1991 U.S. LEXIS 3023

Case history
- Prior: 860 F.2d 1308 (5th Cir. 1988); vacated on rehearing en banc, 895 F.2d 218 (5th Cir. 1990); cert. granted, 498 U.S. 809 (1990).

Holding
- Race-based use of peremptory challenges during jury selection in a civil trial between private litigants violates due process.

Court membership
- Chief Justice William Rehnquist Associate Justices Byron White · Thurgood Marshall; Harry Blackmun · John P. Stevens; Sandra Day O'Connor · Antonin Scalia; Anthony Kennedy · David Souter

Case opinions
- Majority: Kennedy, joined by White, Marshall, Blackmun, Stevens, Souter
- Dissent: O'Connor, joined by Rehnquist, Scalia
- Dissent: Scalia

Laws applied
- U.S. Const. amend. V

Edmonson v. Leesville Concrete Company, 500 U.S. 614 (1991), was a United States Supreme Court case which held that peremptory challenges may not be used to exclude jurors on the basis of race in civil trials. Edmonson extended the court's similar decision in Batson v. Kentucky (1986), a criminal case. The Court applied the equal protection component of the Due Process Clause of the Fifth Amendment, as determined in Bolling v. Sharpe (1954), in finding that such race-based challenges violated the Constitution.

== Background ==
A construction worker, Thaddeus Donald Edmonson, was injured during work on federal property. He sued Leesville Concrete Company for negligence leading to his injuries. During jury selection, Leesville used two of their three peremptory challenges on black jurors, leaving a panel of twelve with one African-American. Edmonson, citing Batson, requested that the trial court require Leesville give a race-neutral reason for the peremptory challenges to black jurors, but the court refused. The jury found that Leesville was responsible for 20% of Edmonson's injury and awarded him $18,000. The United States Court of Appeals for the Fifth Circuit reversed the decision, holding that parties become state actors during jury selection, and so Batson requires race-neutral selection in civil cases. When the Fifth Circuit reheard the case en banc, they affirmed the original District Court decision. Recognizing a circuit split, the Supreme Court granted certiorari.

== Opinion of the Court ==
Justice Anthony Kennedy wrote the opinion for the majority. Justice Kennedy began with a long line of cases where the court held that racial discrimination was impermissible in jury selection before a criminal trial. He then pointed out that although the Court had never indicated such discrimination was permitted in a civil trial, either, it also holds that federal law restrains the actions of government, not private actors. To decide whether to apply federal law, Justice Kennedy applied a two-part test from Lugar v. Edmondson Oil Co. The first part of the test is whether the constitutional deprivation, in this case the right to a fair and impartial jury, resulted from a right rooted in state authority. Kennedy found, almost summarily, that peremptory challenges' intimate role in shaping a jury meant the case met the first part of the test. The second part of the test is whether the private party, Leesville and its counsel, was acting as a "state actor".

In determining whether the Leesville was acting as a state actor, Justice Kennedy considered three issues and relevant precedent. The first issue was whether the actor relies on governmental assistance, and Justice Kennedy found that the system of jury selection clearly existed within the sphere of judicial proceedings and would not be possible without the assistance of the judge and all other constituent elements of the institution. The second consideration was whether the actor is performing a traditional function of government. Justice Kennedy first found that the jury was clearly performing a traditional function of government by serving as the finder-of-fact in a civil trial. Second, he drew a parallel between jury selection and elections, indicating that constitutional constraints apply to all the machinery involved in choosing representatives and juries (such as when parties control primary elections). This is unlike any other aspect of civil litigation, none of which involve a government function like jury selection. The third consideration was whether the injury caused was aggravated in a unique way by the incidents of governmental authority. Justice Kennedy said racial discrimination inside the courtroom diminishes the integrity of the courts and "compounds the racial insult" of discrimination.

Justice Kennedy then dealt with the question of whether litigants could raise violations of jurors' rights on their behalf. The relevant precedent in that consideration was Powers v. Ohio, a similar case that dealt with race-based exclusion of jurors during jury selection in a criminal trial. In Powers, the Court held that litigants generally cannot make a claim due to violations of others' rights, except where the litigant has suffered an injury the courts can resolve, has a close relation with the third party, and the third party is hindered in protecting his or her own interests. Justice Kennedy held that all three conditions were met in Edmonson's case, including the resolvable injury. The concrete resolvable injury arose, in Justice Kennedy's view, whenever racial discrimination took place within criminal or civil trials.

The Court did not make a holding regarding whether prima facie evidence of racial discrimination in Edmonson's case actually existed, and remanded the case to the trial court to determine that issue.

=== Dissent ===
Three justices dissented, arguing that there was no state action (which is required for any Fifth or Fourteenth Amendment violation) because the litigants are private parties. Justice Sandra Day O'Connor wrote the dissent, joined by Chief Justice William Rehnquist and Justice Antonin Scalia. Justice O'Connor wrote that "the Court's final argument is that the exercise of a peremptory challenge by a private litigant is state action because it takes place in a courtroom. [But] the actions of a lawyer in a courtroom do not become those of the government by virtue of their location. This is true even if those actions are based on race." "Constitutional 'liability attaches only to those wrongdoers who carry a badge of authority of [the government] and represent it in some capacity.' Tarkanian, 488 U.S., at 191 [double-internal quotation marks omitted]." Therefore, although "[r]acism is a terrible thing ... [t]he Government is not responsible for a peremptory challenge by a private litigant."
