= Batson v. Kentucky =

- Supreme Court of the United States

Argued December 12, 1985 Decided April 30, 1986
- Full case name: Batson v. Kentucky
- Citations: 476 U.S. 79 (more) 106 S. Ct. 1712; 90 L. Ed. 2d 69; 1986 U.S. LEXIS 150; 54 U.S.L.W. 4425

Case history
- Prior: Defendant found guilty in Kentucky Circuit Court; Supreme Court of Kentucky affirmed; cert. granted, 471 U.S. 1052 (1985)
- Subsequent: Remanded

Holding
- The principle announced in Strauder v. West Virginia is reaffirmed; prosecutors may not use race as a factor in making peremptory challenges; defendants must only make a prima facie showing on the evidence from their case to mount a challenge to race-based use of peremptories.

Court membership
- Chief Justice Warren E. Burger Associate Justices William J. Brennan Jr. · Byron White; Thurgood Marshall · Harry Blackmun; Lewis F. Powell Jr. · William Rehnquist; John P. Stevens · Sandra Day O'Connor

Case opinions
- Majority: Powell, joined by Brennan, White, Marshall, Blackmun, Stevens, O'Connor
- Concurrence: White
- Concurrence: Marshall
- Concurrence: Stevens, joined by Brennan
- Concurrence: O'Connor
- Dissent: Burger, joined by Rehnquist
- Dissent: Rehnquist, joined by Burger

Laws applied
- U.S. Const., amend. XIV
- This case overturned a previous ruling or rulings
- Swain v. Alabama (1965)

Batson v. Kentucky, 476 U.S. 79 (1986), is a landmark decision of the United States Supreme Court ruling that a prosecutor's use of a peremptory challenge in a criminal case—the dismissal of jurors without stating a valid cause for doing so—may not be used to exclude jurors based solely on their race. The Court ruled that this practice violated the Equal Protection Clause of the Fourteenth Amendment. The case gave rise to the term Batson challenge, an objection to a peremptory challenge based on the standard established by the Supreme Court's decision in this case. Subsequent jurisprudence has resulted in the extension of Batson to civil cases (Edmonson v. Leesville Concrete Company) and cases where jurors are excluded on the basis of sex (J.E.B. v. Alabama ex rel. T.B.).

The principle had been established previously by several state courts, including the California Supreme Court in 1978, the Massachusetts Supreme Judicial Court in 1979, and the Florida Supreme Court in 1984.

== Background ==
James Kirkland Batson was an African American man convicted of burglary and receipt of stolen goods in a Louisville, Kentucky circuit court by a jury composed entirely of white jurors. The key part of his appeal was based on the jury selection, or voir dire, phase of the trial. During jury selection, potential jurors are examined by the Court, the prosecution, and the defense, to determine their competence, willingness, and suitability to hear, deliberate and decide a case put to them to render a verdict. During voir dire the judge can dismiss jurors, and both the prosecution and the defense have a limited number of peremptory challenges, which are accepted on their face, as the right of the party making the challenge and which they use to excuse any juror for any reason which the particular side believes will help their case.

In this case, the judge dismissed several potential jurors for various causes. The defense peremptorily challenged nine potential jurors and the prosecutor, Joe Gutmann, peremptorily challenged six, including all four black potential jurors, and a jury composed only of white persons was selected. The defense counsel moved to discharge the whole jury on the ground that the prosecutor's removal of black people from the jury pool violated petitioner's rights under the Sixth and Fourteenth Amendments to a jury drawn from a cross section of the community, and under the Fourteenth Amendment to equal protection of the laws. Without expressly ruling on petitioner's request for a hearing, the trial judge denied the motion, and the jury ultimately convicted the defendant.

The defendant appealed his conviction to the Kentucky Supreme Court, which affirmed the conviction. That court cited Swain v. Alabama, and held that a defendant alleging lack of a fair cross section must demonstrate systematic exclusion of a group of jurors from the panel of prospective jurors. That is, the defendant had to show that not just in his case, but as a process, juries in his community were being constructed so as to not represent a cross section of that community. Batson continued his appeal to the U.S. Supreme Court, which granted certiorari.

== The Supreme Court's decision ==
In a 7–2 decision authored by Justice Lewis Powell, the Supreme Court ruled in Batson's favor. The court overruled Swain v. Alabama by lowering the burden of proof that a defendant must meet to make a prima facie case of purposeful discrimination. In Swain, the Court had recognized that a "State's purposeful or deliberate denial to Negroes on account of race of participation as jurors in the administration of justice violates the Equal Protection Clause", but that the defendant had the burden of proving a systematic striking of black jurors throughout the county, that is, that the peremptory challenge system as a whole was being perverted. In Batson the court ruled that the defendant could make a prima facie case for purposeful racial discrimination in jury selection by relying on the record only in his own case. The Court explained:

The defendant first must show that he is a member of a cognizable racial group, and that the prosecutor has exercised peremptory challenges to remove from the venire [jury pool] members of the defendant's race. The defendant may also rely on the fact that peremptory challenges constitute a jury selection practice that permits those to discriminate who are of a mind to discriminate. Finally, the defendant must show that such facts and any other relevant circumstances raise an inference that the prosecutor used peremptory challenges to exclude the veniremen from the petit jury on account of their race. Once the defendant makes a prima facie showing, the burden shifts to the State to come forward with a neutral explanation for challenging black jurors.

The Court also held that:

- A State denies a black defendant equal protection when it puts him on trial before a jury from which members of his race have been purposely excluded
- A defendant has no right to a petit jury composed in whole or in part of persons of his own race. However, the Equal Protection Clause guarantees the defendant that the State will not exclude members of his race from the jury venire on account of race, or on the false assumption that members of his race as a group are not qualified to serve as jurors
- The peremptory challenge occupies an important position in trial procedures

Justice Marshall, concurring with the majority, called the decision "historic" but added: "The decision today will not end the racial discrimination that peremptories inject into the jury-selection process. That goal can be accomplished only by eliminating peremptory challenges entirely."

=== Dissents ===
In his dissenting opinion, Chief Justice Warren Burger argued that the court's decision in Batson "sets aside the peremptory challenge, a procedure which has been part of the common law for many centuries and part of our jury system for nearly 200 years". He believed the majority was replacing peremptory challenges with something very similar to challenge for cause, but was unclear in explaining the standard to be applied. "I am at a loss to discern the governing principles here", he wrote. "I join my colleagues in wishing the nation's judges well as they struggle to grasp how to implement today's holding."

Justice Rehnquist wrote that the majority misapplied equal protection doctrine: "In my view, there is simply nothing 'unequal' about the state using its peremptory challenges to strike blacks from the jury in cases involving black defendants, so long as such challenges are also used to exclude whites in cases involving white defendants, Hispanics in cases involving Hispanic defendants, Asians in cases involving Asian defendants, and so on."

=== Impact ===
Whether the principles of Batson applied retroactively to anyone convicted previously by juries whose racial composition was influenced by peremptory challenges not consistent with this opinion was for a time uncertain. In Allen v. Hardy (1986), the Court held that it did not apply retroactively to collateral review of final convictions. In Griffith v. Kentucky (1987), it decided it would apply it in cases on direct review.

== Batson challenge ==
The term Batson challenge describes an objection to opposing counsel's use of a peremptory challenge to exclude a juror from the jury pool based on criteria the courts have found disqualifying, as race was the sole rationale for exclusion in Batson.

In some cases, parties have appealed a verdict or judgment and asked it be invalidated because one or more peremptory challenges excluded a cognizable group from the jury. Although the Batson decision addressed jury selection in criminal trials, in 1991 the Supreme Court later extended the same rule to civil trials in Edmonson v. Leesville Concrete Company. In 1994, in J.E.B. v. Alabama ex rel. T.B., the Court held that peremptory challenges based on sex alone violated the standard established in Batson as well.

The authority of Batson was reinforced by a pair of 2005 decisions, Miller-El v. Dretke and Johnson v. California. The first expanded the evidence that can be considered when establishing that a peremptory challenge was based solely on objectionable criteria. The second addressed the standard of proof by which a Batson challenge should be assessed, finding that it was sufficient to require "an inference" that discrimination was the basis for a peremptory challenge rather than proof that discrimination was "more likely than not" its basis.

Batson has been applied to the discriminatory use of peremptory strikes against judges in a California case, Superior Court v. Williams. Defense counsel objected to the prosecution's motion to disqualify an African-American judge, suspecting that the motion was racially motivated. The Court noted that use of Equal Protection in Batson to combat racially discriminatory strikes against jurors was well established and that subsequent decisions had extended these protections in other contexts. The Court held that "these principles are equally applicable to race-based challenges to judges."

=== U.S. v. Blaylock ===
An attempt to extend Batson to cover challenges based on sexual orientation failed in 2005. The Eighth Circuit Court of Appeals rejected a defendant's criminal appeal in U.S. v. Blaylock, because it found the prosecution had "offered legitimate nondiscriminatory reasons for striking the panel member". The court did not consider whether the Batson challenge rule applied, but its opinion expressed doubt that it did.

=== SmithKline v. Abbott ===
Extending Batson to cover challenges based on sexual orientation was revisited again in 2012, this time in a civil case. A three-judge panel of the Ninth Circuit Court of Appeals considered the issue in SmithKline Beecham Corporation v. Abbott Laboratories: It ruled unanimously in a landmark decision on January 21, 2014, that, based on the U.S. Supreme Court decision in United States v. Windsor, distinctions based on sexual orientation are subject to the "heightened scrutiny" standard of review and that "equal protection prohibits peremptory strikes based on sexual orientation". Defendant Abbott Laboratories decided not to appeal further. However, at least one circuit judge sua sponte called for rehearing en banc, and on March 27 the court asked both parties to file briefs on the question. On June 24, the judges of the Ninth Circuit voted not to rehear the case en banc.

=== Subsequent Supreme Court cases ===
- Allen v. Hardy, 478 U.S. 255 (1986)
- Griffith v. Kentucky, 479 U.S. 314 (1987)
- Ross v. Oklahoma, 487 U.S. 81 (1988)
- Teague v. Lane, 489 U.S. 288 (1989)
- Holland v. Illinois, 493 U.S. 474 (1990)
- Alvarado v. United States, 497 U.S. 543 (1990)
- Ford v. Georgia, 498 U.S. 411 (1991)
- Powers v. Ohio, 499 U.S. 400 (1991)
- Hernandez v. New York, 500 U.S. 352 (1991)
- Edmonson v. Leesville Concrete Co., 500 U.S. 614 (1991)
- Trevino v. Texas, 503 U.S. 562 (1992)
- Georgia v. McCollum, 505 U.S. 42 (1992)
- JEB v. Alabama Ex Rel. TB, 511 U.S. 127 (1994)
- Purkett v. Elem, 514 U.S. 765 (1995)
- Campbell v. Louisiana, 523 U.S. 392 (1998)
- Miller-El v. Cockrell, 537 U.S. 322 (2003)
- Johnson v. California, 541 U.S. 428 (2004)
- Johnson v. California, 545 U.S. 162 (2005)
- Miller-El v. Dretke, 545 U.S. 231 (2005)
- Rice v. Collins, 546 U.S. 333 (2006)
- Snyder v. Louisiana, 552 U.S. 472 (2008)
- Rivera v. Illinois, 556 U.S. 148
- Thaler v. Haynes, 559 U.S. 1088 (2010)
- Felkner v. Jackson, 562 U.S. 594
- Davis v. Ayala
- Foster v. Chatman
- Flowers v. Mississippi

== Case participants after Batson ==
When the Supreme Court reversed his conviction, Batson was serving a twenty-year sentence. Rather than risk a retrial, he pleaded guilty to burglary and received a five-year prison sentence. After his release, Batson was convicted of several offenses including burglary, theft, receiving stolen property, and persistent-felony convictions. He was released from prison again in January 2003 and remains on parole through 2026. Since his release, he worked as a construction worker and later said of the media attention the case received: "It's so old, they ought to let it go".

Joe Gutmann, the prosecutor in Batson's 1982 trial, said he had removed the black members of the venire not because of their race, but because they were young and might sympathize with Batson. He later stated that the Supreme Court's decision was "a good one" because it prevents lawyers from discriminating in jury selection. He left the prosecutor's office in 2001 and, since then, taught government and history at the predominantly black, inner-city Louisville Central High School.

Batson and Gutmann later met while Batson was distributing a book he had written trying to discourage youth from crime. The two reconciled and have since become good friends.

== See also ==
- All-white jury
- Edmonson v. Leesville Concrete Co. (1991)
- Georgia v. McCollum (1992)
- J.E.B. v. Alabama ex rel. T.B. (1994)
- Snyder v. Louisiana (2008)
- Flowers v. Mississippi (2019)
