= Peremptory challenge =

Dismissal of potential jurors from jury duty

The right of peremptory challenge is a legal right in jury selection for the attorneys to reject a certain number of potential jurors or judges without stating a reason. The idea behind peremptory challenges is that if both parties have contributed in the configuration of the jury, they will find its verdict more acceptable. The use of peremptory challenges is controversial as some feel it has been used to undermine the balanced representation on a jury which would occur using random selection. Many jurisdictions limit or prohibit peremptory challenges.

== Description ==
In law, the right of peremptory challenge is a right in jury selection for the attorneys to reject a certain number of potential jurors without stating a reason. Other potential jurors may be challenged for cause, i.e. by giving a good reason why they might be unable to reach a fair verdict, but the challenge will be considered by the presiding judge and may be denied. A peremptory challenge can be a major part of voir dire. A peremptory challenge also allows attorneys to veto a potential juror on a "hunch".

The idea behind peremptory challenges is that if both parties have contributed in the configuration of the jury, they will find its verdict more acceptable. The existence of peremptory challenges is alleged to be an important safeguard in the judicial process, allowing both the defendant and the prosecution to get rid of potentially biased jurors, however with no reason given for their dismissal, this could never be proven. Their use allows attorneys to use their training and experience to dismiss jurors who might say the correct thing, but might otherwise harbor prejudices that could infringe the rights of the defendant to a fair trial.

== Controversy ==
The use of peremptory challenges is controversial as some feel it has been used to undermine the balanced representation on a jury which would occur using random selection. While courts are not allowed to strike out entire groups of people from a particular jury, some would argue that peremptory challenges give individual parties this power. This reach of power has allowed, and still can allow, attorneys to simply strike out groups of people, even if just on a whim (e.g., all football fans may be struck from the jury). In the criminal case Batson v. Kentucky, 476 U.S. 79 (1986), it was held that the prosecution's actions of striking groups of people based on race violated parties' right to equal protection. Justice Thurgood Marshall, while concurring with the opinion, believed that ending racism in jury selection could "be accomplished only by eliminating peremptory challenges entirely." Batson's holding was further applied to civil cases in 1991. Despite this, peremptory challenges still remain in use in several jurisdictions around the world, and in some cases lead to extensive and expensive jury research aimed at producing a favorable jury.

In the American legal system of the past, attorneys' power to exercise peremptory challenges was nearly unlimited; this fueled the controversy over whether this process tampered with the fairness of jury trial. In response, the American judicial system has begun to use restrictions. These restrictions have been put into place in different regions, some by statutes, some by common law (i.e. case decisions).

A further criticism of this kind of jury selection is that it makes it easier to achieve a conviction, which critics argue leads to a higher chance of wrongful convictions. In most (if not all) jury systems, a super-majority (or unanimity) is required to convict (e.g., in the UK a 10 to 2 majority may be accepted by the judge if a unanimous decision cannot be reached). If both sides are able to challenge jurors, the prosecution would be expected to try to remove those with a general tendency to wish to acquit and the defense would be expected to challenge those they think have a general tendency to convict. If both sides do their job equally well, then the tendency will be to turn what would have been a small majority (one way or the other) into a strong majority in the same direction, potentially causing the proportion to rise over the super-majority threshold required.

This effect can be (and often is) partially mitigated by giving the defense more peremptory challenges than the prosecution (e.g., when indicted on a felony in the US the defense gets 10 challenges to the prosecution's 6).

=== Disqualification of judges ===
Another form of the peremptory challenge (or peremptory disqualification), available in some jurisdictions, is the right to remove a judge assigned to hear the case without showing that the judge is actually biased or had a conflict of interest. While actual determination of a judge's bias is not required to employ the peremptory challenge, the moving party must still allege bias under oath. In jurisdictions that have this form of peremptory challenge, it generally may only be used once per party per case.

== Use by country ==
=== Argentina ===
The majority of the provinces in Argentina allow four peremptories per side and limitless challenges for cause during the voir dire.

=== Australia ===
All Australian states allow a varying number of peremptory challenges in jury selection.

=== Canada ===
The rules regarding peremptory challenges in Canada were laid out in §634 of the Criminal Code of Canada. The number of challenges awarded to each of the prosecutor and the defense depended on the type of charge and maximum potential sentence. Twenty challenges were awarded in cases for high treason and first degree murder, twelve challenges for offenses with a maximum penalty greater than five years, and four challenges for jury eligible offenses with a penalty of five years or less; In cases where the judge orders thirteen or fourteen jurors instead of the usual twelve, both sides receive another challenge per each additional juror.

§634 of the Criminal Code of Canada was repealed by Bill C-75 which came into effect on September 19, 2019, and peremptory challenges have been therefore eliminated.

=== Hong Kong ===
Peremptory challenges are permitted in Hong Kong. No statutory change has been made to abolish the right. Each party of the defence is entitled to challenge up to a maximum of five jurors without providing cause.

=== Ireland ===
Peremptory challenges (referred to as "challenge without cause shown") are permitted in Ireland, with each side being allowed seven such challenges.

=== New Zealand ===
Each party is entitled to four peremptory challenges in New Zealand, and where there are two or more accused the prosecution is provided with a maximum of eight.

=== United Kingdom ===
Peremptory challenges have been abolished in the United Kingdom.

==== England ====
Peremptory challenges were first used in England not many years after the assizes of Clarendon of 1166 allowed jury trials. When the concept was first introduced into the jury system, the maximum number of peremptory challenges allowed was thirty-five. As time went on, this number was reduced, and by the year 1509 the maximum number of peremptory challenges was twenty. By 1977, the number of peremptory challenges granted to each side was reduced from seven to three. The right of peremptory challenge was abolished altogether by the Criminal Justice Act 1988, which saw it as a derogation from the principle of random selection, and felt that its removal would increase the fairness of the jury system.

==== Northern Ireland ====
Unlike the rest of the United Kingdom, peremptory challenge survived in Northern Ireland into the twenty-first century. The Juries (Northern Ireland) Order 1996 entitled each party to a maximum of six peremptory challenges in civil cases. In criminal cases, each defendant was entitled to a maximum of twelve peremptory challenges and each prosecutor could only challenge for cause.

Northern Ireland was brought into line with England and Wales, and with Scotland, in 2007 when peremptory challenge was finally abolished by the Justice and Security (Northern Ireland) Act.

=== United States ===
Nearly all jurisdictions in the United States (including the Virgin Islands) allow for peremptory challenges; the number depends on the jurisdiction and the type of case (e.g., more challenges may be permitted in a murder case than for DWI). On August 24, 2021, the Arizona Supreme Court enacted a rule change eliminating peremptory challenges in both civil and criminal cases, making Arizona the first state to end the practice. The change went into effect on January 1, 2022.

In the United States, the use of peremptory challenges by criminal prosecutors to remove persons from a cognizable group (i.e., of one race, ethnicity, or gender) based solely on that group characteristic has been ruled to be unconstitutional in Batson v. Kentucky, 476 U.S. 79 (1986). The term "Batson challenge" is used to refer to the act of arguing for the invalidity of a trial on the basis that peremptory challenges during jury selection resulted in the exclusion of a cognizable group.

Batson′s authority has also recently been reinforced in a pair of 2005 decisions, Miller-El v. Dretke, 545 U.S. 231 (2005), and Johnson v. California, 545 U.S. 162 (2005). In 2009, the United States Supreme Court found in a unanimous opinion in Rivera v. Illinois that "there is no freestanding constitutional right to peremptory challenges", even when a court was mistaken in applying Batson.

As of 1994, the Supreme Court decision J.E.B. v. Alabama ex rel. T.B. extended the prohibition to gender. As of 2014, the 9th Circuit Court of Appeals has held that a peremptory challenge based on perceived sexual orientation is unconstitutional.

== See also ==
- Strike for cause
