= Jury sequestration =

Isolation of a jury to avoid accidental or deliberate tainting

Jury sequestration is the isolation of a jury to avoid accidental or deliberate tainting of the jury by exposing them to outside influence or information that is not admissible in court. In such cases, jurors are usually housed at a hotel, where they are not allowed to read newspapers, watch television, or access the Internet, and may have only limited contact with others, even each other.

Sequestration is rare, and becoming less common, due to the expense and concerns about the impact on jury members. In most trials that last more than a single day, jurors are instead sent home for the night with instructions to isolate themselves from inappropriate influence until they return and the trial resumes. Sequestration is most commonly used in high-profile trials in which media coverage and public conversations about the case may be so ubiquitous that it is difficult for jurors to avoid. A judge also may order that a jury be sequestered to prevent others from tampering with them through undue persuasion, threats, or bribes.

== Notable cases in the United States ==
The Harry Thaw trial for the murder of Stanford White, known as "The Trial of the Century," was the first to use a sequestered jury due to the excessive media attention and high-profile nature of the case.

The trials of Sam Sheppard in 1966, Charles Manson in 1970, O.J. Simpson in 1995, Casey Marie Anthony in 2011, George Zimmerman in 2013, and Bill Cosby in 2017 were modern cases in which it was done, with the jury spending 265 days in sequestration in the Simpson case.

In 2021, the jury in the Derek Chauvin murder trial was partially sequestered during the trial itself, and fully sequestered during deliberations. While the trial proceedings were ongoing, jurors were permitted to go home overnight, but parked in a secure location and were escorted between it and a private entrance to the courthouse. While the jurors were not monitored at home, the jurors were monitored at all times while in the courthouse, including during breaks and meals. The jury was fully sequestered once deliberations began.

== See also ==
- Embracery
- Contempt of court
- Obstruction of justice
- Witness tampering
