= Ultimate fact =

In law, the ultimate fact is the conclusion (or conclusions) of fact logically derived from the evidence, as made by a jury after deliberation or by a judge at a bench trial.

For example, in the New York case of People v. Murphy., after the defendant was rebuffed by his drug dealer's girlfriend and her sister, he invaded their apartment, sought and found a hammer, and hit each of the three women present (the pregnant girlfriend, her sister and her niece) on their heads with the claw end of the hammer, killing his pregnant girlfriend who died after the delivery of her baby by Caesarean section, and injuring the other women. The ultimate fact decided by the jury was that he intended to kill all three of them.

== See also ==
- Evidence
- Jury instructions
- Trier of fact
- Ultimate issue (law)
