= Constitution Society (disambiguation) =

The Constitution Society is a nonprofit educational organization headquartered in San Antonio, Texas, USA.

Constitution Society or The Constitution Society may also refer to:

- American Constitution Society, a nonprofit advocacy group founded in 2001

== See also ==
- Society for Constitutional Information, founded in 1780 to promote parliamentary reform
