= CJP =

CJP may refer to:

- Canadian Journal of Philosophy
- Canadian Journal of Physics
- Congress Jananayaka Peravai
- Capital Jury Project
- Caribbean Jazz Project
- Chief Justice of Pakistan
- Chinese Journal of Physics
- Cockroach Janta Party
- Citizens for Justice and Peace
