= Factfinder =

Factfinder may refer to:

- Trier of fact, a legal position.
- American FactFinder, a data retrieval product of the U.S. Census Bureau.
