= Ultimate issue =

An ultimate issue in criminal law is a legal issue at stake in the prosecution of a crime for which an expert witness is providing testimony.

== Example ==
If the issue is the defendant's mental state at the time of the offense, the ultimate issue would be the defendant's sanity or insanity during the commission of the crime. In the past, expert witnesses were allowed to give testimony on ultimate issues, such as the applicability of the insanity defense to a particular defendant. However, after the 1982 trial of John Hinckley Jr., the federal rules of evidence were changed. Now in the United States, federal courts and some states have rules of evidence that specifically rule out legal conclusions drawn by expert witnesses in their testimony. However, a large amount of judicial discretion is allowed in how this rule is applied, resulting in an uneven application of rules across jurisdictions.

== Definition ==
The Federal Rules do not say what falls within the definition of an "ultimate issue." However, a long history of case law on the subject suggests that an expert witness runs afoul if he uses the same words (words with legal meaning) that will ultimately be presented to the jury. One court excluded a psychologist's evidence on the credibility of prosecution's witness on the grounds that it amounted to an "ultimate opinion", meaning this was an opinion that could only be properly reached by a jury.

The expert witness testimony is confined to giving an opinion on whether the defendant had a serious mental disorder at the time of the offense, and explaining the symptoms and characteristics of any diagnosis given, including other testimony regarding the defendant's mental status (mens rea) and motivation. The expert witness cannot make a statement addressing the issue of whether the legal test for insanity has been met. That is left to the judge and jury. The restriction of expert opinion on ultimate issues includes any testimony on the criminal elements, including testimony that would bear on the mental state of the defendant relevant to ultimate legal decisions to be decided by the triers of fact.

== History ==
The Federal Rules of Evidence adopted in 1975 (and their state counterparts) expressly allowed expert testimony to include statements on ultimate issues if such statements will be helpful to the judge or jury. In 1984, Federal Rule of Evidence 704(b) was added following the trial of John Hinckley Jr. for the attempted assassination of U.S. President Ronald Reagan. The changes were in part a result of the public backlash due to Hinckley's successful use of the insanity defense. These changes, in particular Rule 704(b), put limits on expert witness testimony.

The new rules of evidence restrict the testimony allowed on the ultimate issue. Rule 704(b) states that in criminal actions, the mental health expert may testify to the defendant's mental disorder or defect and its symptoms, but may not offer a conclusion on an ultimate issue such as the sanity or insanity of the defendant. The expert witness must refrain from merely giving the jury a conclusion that pertains to the legal issues at hand and cannot testify to legal conclusions (ultimate issues), the rationale being that mental health professional are not attorneys. Judicial discretion remains in determining the limits of testimony as well, such that any testimony that "wastes time' or is irrelevant can be barred. The rationale for this restriction was stated in the legislative history of the rule as the following:

The purpose of this amendment is to eliminate the confusing spectacle of competing expert witnesses testifying to directly contradictory conclusions as to the ultimate legal issue to be found by the trier of fact.

The result is that large gray areas remain regarding exactly what testimony is allowed. For example, the Third Circuit Court of Appeals in United States v. Rutland ruled that testimony from "an extraordinarily qualified handwriting expert" was admissible on the "ultimate issue of authorship of key documents".

== Jeffrey R. MacDonald trial ==
An example of how this change in the rules of evidence can affect trial testimony is demonstrated in an analysis of the 1979 trial of Jeffrey R. MacDonald, a physician, for the murder of his wife and children, if his trial occurred today. In that trial, an expert testified in support of the defense hypothesis that someone else committed the murders. Expert testimony that the defendant had a "personality configuration inconsistent with the outrageous and senseless murders of [his] family" was not allowed under the rules of evidence in effect at the time because it was considered confusing and misleading. However, under Rule 704(b) this character testimony would not be barred since testimony regarding "personality configuration" is general psychological evidence unrelated to any ultimate issues such as intent or malice aforethought. Also, an expert witness would not be in violation of 704(b) in use today if he gave testimony regarding the defendant's positive behaviors, such as acting like a loving father and husband, which might create the impression that he was not capable of committing such a crime, but is an opinion unrelated to guilt.

== Conclusions ==
Rules of evidence are meant to screen what evidence the jury may consider to prevent testimony that is mere opinion from infringing upon the territory of jury decision-making. Rule 704(b) reversed the trend toward permitting the testimony of experts on the ultimate issue. Since so much faith is placed in the jury system, limiting what a jury can consider narrows the jury's options. As in the past, lay witnesses may testify to facts only.

The result of rule 704(b) is to prevent expert witnesses such as psychologists and psychiatrists from testimony regarding how the defendant's mental state affected an element of the crime or an element of the defense. It has been ruled that 704(b) bans expert opinions on mental states affecting other elements, not only on questions of insanity, but also on questions on all mental states forming an element of a crime or defense such as premeditation in a murder case or specific intent and mens rea.

== English law ==
The position under English law is different from that in the United States as there is no rule preventing an expert from giving an opinion on the 'ultimate issue' in England and Wales. This has been confirmed by the English Courts in both criminal and civil cases.

== See also ==
- Capital Jury Project
- Ultimate fact
