= Bench trial =

Type of legal trial

A bench trial is a trial by judge, as opposed to a jury. The term applies most appropriately to any administrative hearing in relation to a summary offense to distinguish the type of trial. Many legal systems (Roman, Islamic) use bench trials for most or all cases or for certain types of cases.

As a jury renders a verdict, in a bench trial, a judge does the same by making a finding.

== United Kingdom ==
=== England and Wales ===
Most civil trials proceed without a jury and are heard by a judge sitting alone.

Summary criminal trials may be heard by a single district judge (magistrates' court) or by a panel of at least two, but more usually three, magistrates.

Section 47 of the Criminal Justice Act 2003 allows a bench trial for indictable offences, but is rarely used, having been exercised only twice since its inception.

=== Scotland ===
Most civil trials in Scotland are conducted in a sheriff court by a sheriff sitting alone. In the Court of Session, a judge in either the outer or inner house usually sits alone; but may sit with a jury in certain trials such as personal injury claims.

Summary criminal trials are conducted by a sheriff in a sheriff court or a justice of the peace in the justice of the peace court sitting alone as regulated by the Criminal Procedure (Scotland) Act 1995. Those trials requiring juries are called solemn procedure and are also regulated under the Act.

== Turks and Caicos ==
One of the recommendations of the Commission of Inquiry 2008–2009 in Turks and Caicos was that provisions be made for criminal trials without juries, following the precedent in England and Wales. Other examples cited included the United States, the Commonwealth of Nations including India and Canada, the British overseas territories of the Falkland Islands and St. Helena, and the Netherlands.

== United States ==
In United States law, for most criminal cases that proceed to trial, trial by jury is usually a matter of course as it is a constitutional right under the Sixth Amendment and cannot be waived without certain requirements. In the federal court system, under Rule 23 of the Federal Rules of Criminal Procedure, if a defendant is entitled to a jury trial, the trial must be by jury unless the defendant waives a jury trial in writing. In the various state court systems, waiver of jury trial can vary by jurisdiction. Missouri has Missouri Supreme Court Rule 27.01(b), "The defendant may, with the assent of the court, waive a trial by jury and submit the trial of any criminal case to the court..."; the prosecution needs not consent.

With bench trials, the judge plays the role of the jury as finder of fact in addition to making conclusions of law. In some bench trials, both sides have already stipulated to all the facts in the case (such as civil disobedience cases designed to test the constitutionality of a law). Because of needing fewer formalities, these cases are usually faster than jury trials. For example, there is no jury selection phase and no need for sequestration or jury instructions.

A bench trial (whether criminal or civil) that is presided over by a judge has some distinctive characteristics, but it is similar to a jury trial. For example, the rules of evidence and methods of objection are the same in a bench trial as in a jury trial. Bench trials, however, are frequently less formal than jury trials. It is often less necessary to protect the record with objections, and sometimes evidence is accepted de bene or provisionally, subject to the possibility of being struck in the future.

== India ==
All trials in India since 1973 are heard by a judge or a division bench of judges. The main reason for the abolishment of jury trial in India was due to a popular case K. M. Nanavati vs State of Maharashtra, in which the jury gave a verdict of not guilty even when all the evidence was present against the accused, resulting in a jury nullification.

== Civil law ==
In most countries with "Roman law" or civil law, there is no "jury" in the English sense, and trials are necessarily bench trials. However, in more complicated cases, lay judges can be called. They are not randomly selected, as juries are. They are professional, although not legally trained as jurists, and vote as judges. One notable exception, from French law, is cour d'assises, where jurors are allotted and vote alongside professional judges.

== See also ==
- Bench (law)
- Jury trial
- Criminal law
- Civil law
- Diplock courts
- Special Criminal Court
