= Jury tampering =

Crime of attempting to influence a jury

Jury tampering is the crime of unduly attempting to influence the composition or decisions of a jury during the course of a trial. The means by which this crime could be perpetrated can include attempting to discredit potential jurors to ensure they will not be selected for duty. Once selected, jurors could be bribed or intimidated to act in a certain manner on duty. It could also involve making unauthorized contact with them for the purpose of introducing prohibited outside information and then arguing for a mistrial. In the United States, people have also been charged with jury tampering for handing out pamphlets and flyers indicating that jurors have certain rights and obligations, including an obligation to vote their conscience notwithstanding the instructions they are given by the judge.

== Ireland ==
In Ireland, the Special Criminal Court is a three-judge, juryless court which tries cases based on a majority vote. Use of the Special Criminal Court is restricted to cases where "ordinary courts are inadequate to secure the effective administration of justice", and is allowed for by the Constitution of Ireland. While the power was initially created to prevent court cases being subverted by juries sympathetic to the defendant, the Special Criminal Court was established in 1972 to handle paramilitary cases resulting from the Troubles, when the risk of jury intimidation was high and there had also been a series of light sentences and acquittals by judges and juries sympathetic to the defendants. It has since been used to try cases of high-profile gang leaders and other high-risk non-terrorism cases where normal juries risk intimidation or revenge.

== United Kingdom ==
In Great Britain, the Criminal Justice Act 2003 allows for non-jury trials when there is danger of jury tampering, or where jury tampering has taken place. On 18 June 2009, the Court of Appeal in England and Wales made a landmark ruling that resulted in the Lord Chief Justice, Lord Judge, allowing the first-ever criminal trial to be held without a jury by invoking Section 44 of the Criminal Justice Act 2003. The case in question involved four men accused of an armed robbery at Heathrow Airport in February 2004. After three juries either failed to reach verdicts or were discharged, the fourth trial of the case took place before a single judge, and ended on 31 March 2010 with guilty verdicts for all four accused. The UK had previously established non-jury courts in Northern Ireland, known as Diplock Courts.

Levels of jury tampering were reported in 2002 to be a "major problem" by the deputy commissioner of the London Metropolitan Police and in 2003 to be "worryingly high" in Merseyside by the then Chief Constable Norman Bettison and the then Home Secretary David Blunkett.

== Cases ==
- Before the trial of Al Capone in 1931 was set to begin, his Chicago Outfit received the complete list of prospective jurors. However, Judge James Herbert Wilkerson prevented it by having the entire jury panel switched out with another just before the trial opened.
- Gil Dozier, Louisiana Commissioner of Agriculture and Forestry, was charged with jury tampering while on bail and after being convicted of five felonies, including extortion and racketeering. He served nearly four years in prison.
- Jimmy Hoffa, a trade union leader, was convicted of jury tampering in 1964.
- The former West Virginia Governor, William Wallace Barron was convicted of jury tampering in 1971.
- George Pape, a jury foreman in a 1987 trial of John Gotti, sought out Gotti's underlings, who agreed to pay him $75,000 in exchange for a not guilty vote. Pape was later convicted of jury tampering and sentenced to three years imprisonment.
- In 2007, an attempt to bribe a juror in a case investigating cigarette smuggling in Northern Ireland led to the retrial being heard by a judge sitting alone, the first such ruling.

== See also ==
- Contempt of court
- Embracery
- Obstruction of justice
- Witness tampering
