= Bushel's Case =

1670 English legal case

- Court: Court of Common Pleas
- Decided: 1670
- Citation: 124 E.R. 1006

Court membership
- Judge sitting: Sir John Vaughan

Bushel’s Case (1670) 124 E.R. 1006, also spelled Bushell's Case, was a landmark English decision on the role of juries. It established beyond question the independence of the jury. It also confirmed that the Court of Common Pleas could issue a writ of habeas corpus in ordinary criminal cases.

== Background ==
Bushel's Case arose from a previous case (R v. Penn and Mead or Trial of Penn and Mead, 6 How. 951) involving two Quakers charged with unlawful assembly, William Penn (the future founder of Pennsylvania) and William Mead. They had been arrested in August 1670 for violating the Conventicle Act, which forbade religious assemblies of more than five people outside the auspices of the Church of England. The jury found the two "guilty of speaking in Gracechurch Street" but refused to find "an unlawful assembly". The infuriated judge charged the jury that they "shall not be dismissed until we have a verdict that the court will accept".

The jury modified the verdict to "guilty of speaking to an assembly in Gracechurch Street" but again refused to find the assembly "unlawful", whereupon the judge had them locked up overnight without food, water or heat. The judge ordered Penn bound and gagged. Penn protested, shouting to the jury, "You are Englishmen, mind your Privilege, give not away your Right", to which foreman of the jury Edward Bushel replied, "Nor shall we ever do." Finally, after a two-day fast in the Tower of London, the jury returned a not guilty verdict. The judge fined the jury for contempt of court for returning a verdict contrary to their own findings of fact and removed them to prison until the fine was paid. Penn protested that this violated Magna Carta and was forcibly removed from the court.

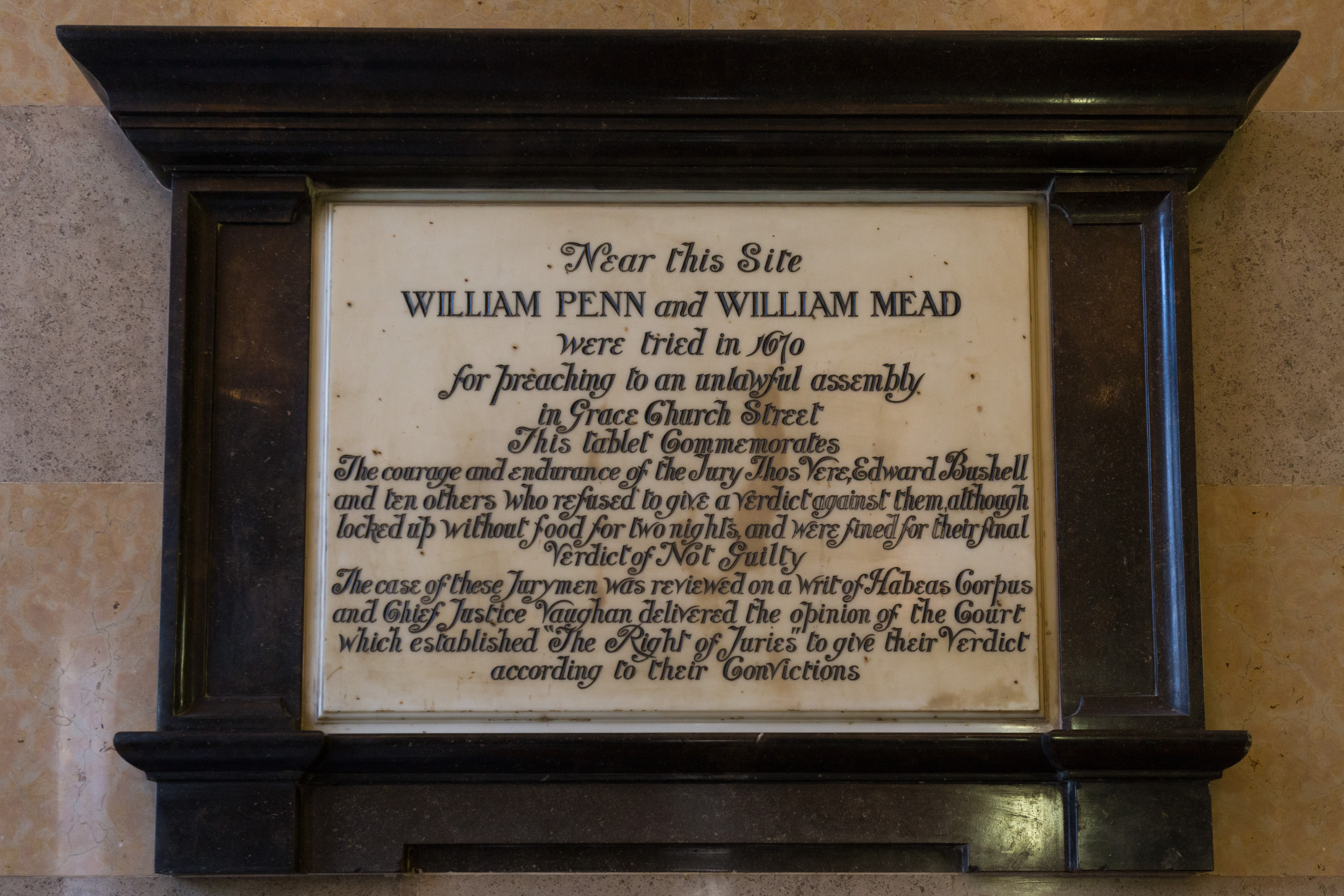
Plaque at the Old Bailey commemorating "Edward Bushell and ten others who refused to give a verdict against them"

Edward Bushel — also written as Edward Bushell, a member and foreman of the jury, nonetheless refused to pay the fine and was released through a writ of habeas corpus.

== Decision ==
Bushel petitioned the Court of Common Pleas for a writ of habeas corpus. Sir John Vaughan, Chief Justice of the Court of Common Pleas, initially held that the writ should not be granted, saying that it was King's Bench that should issue writs of habeas corpus in ordinary criminal cases and that Common Pleas could issue the writ only on a claim of privilege of the court (e.g., if the petitioner were an attorney of Common Pleas); the other justices issued the writ, however. Vaughan ruled in November 1670 that a jury could not be punished simply on account of the verdict it returned, but that individual jurors could still be punished if it could be demonstrated that they had acted improperly.

== See also ==
- Jury nullification, called a "perverse verdict" in English law

== Bibliography ==
- "The Trial of William Penn and William Mead, at the Old Bailey, for a Tumultuous Assembly", 22 Charles II. A. D. 1670, Howell's State Trials, Vol. 6, Page 951, at Constitution Society
- "Case of the Imprisonment of Edward Bushell for alleged Misconduct as a Juryman", 22 Charles II. A. D. 1670, Vaughan's Reports, 135, Howell's State Trials, Vol. 6, Page 999, at Constitution Society
- "Between Local Knowledge and National Politics: Debating Rationales for Jury Nullification after Bushell’s Case" by Simon Stern, 111 Yale Law Journal 1815 (2002).
- Rhodes, David. "Life in Crime: Can a Judge ever direct a jury to convict?" Solicitors Journal 8 December 2006
