= Embracery =

Attempt to corrupt a juror

In common law, embracery is the attempt to influence a juror corruptly to give their verdict in favour of one side or the other in a trial. This may be by promise, persuasions, entreaties, money, entertainments and the like.

== Early English law ==
In English law, embracery was an offence both at common law and by statute, punishable by fine and imprisonment. As a statutory offence it dates back to 1360. The offence is complete, whether any verdict has been given or not, and whether the verdict is in accordance with the weight of evidence or otherwise. The person making the attempt, and any member of the jury who consents, are equally punishable.

The legal term "embracery" comes from the Old French embraseour, an embracer, i.e., one who excites or instigates, literally one who sets on fire, from embraser, to kindle a fire. This is unrelated to the common word "embrace", i.e., to hold or clasp in the arms, which is from French embracer, from Latin bracchia, arms.

The false verdict of a jury, whether occasioned by embracery or otherwise, was formerly considered criminal, and jurors were severely punished, being proceeded against by writ of attaint. This changed in 1670 with Bushel's Case, in which the Court of Common Pleas held that a jury could not be held accountable for its verdict. The Juries Act 1825, in abolishing the by then almost obsolete writs of attaint, made a special exemption as regards jurors guilty of embracery (s.61). Prosecution for the offence has been so extremely rare that when a case occurred in 1891 it was stated that no precedent could be found for the indictment. The defendant was fined £200 (equivalent to £22,000 in 2025), afterwards reduced to £100.

== Modern usage ==
By 2010 the offence was regarded as obsolete and such misconduct more likely to be charged as perverting the course of justice. The last conviction for embracery in the UK was at Caernarvon Crown Court in November 1975 but it was quashed by the Court of Appeal the following year on the initiative of Lord Justice Lawton, who said that the offence was obsolete.

The offence was abolished by section 17 of the Bribery Act 2010, as from 1 July 2011.

In the United States, embracery prosecutions have occurred as recently as 1989, when a county commissioner in Georgia was sentenced to a fine and probation.

Embracery remains a common law offence in Victoria, Australia with a maximum term of 15 years expressly preserved by the Juries Act 2000.

== See also ==
- Jury tampering
