= Capital Jury Project =

U.S. research consortium

The Capital Jury Project (CJP) is a consortium of university-based research studies on the decision-making of jurors in death penalty cases in the United States. It was founded in 1991 and is supported by the National Science Foundation (NSF). The goal of the CJP is to determine whether jurors' sentencing decisions conform to the constitution and do not reflect the arbitrary decisions the United States Supreme Court found when it ruled the death penalty unconstitutional in Furman v. Georgia. That 1972 Supreme Court decision eliminated the death penalty, which was not reinstated until Gregg v. Georgia in 1976.

In 1987, the Supreme Court ruled in McCleskey v. Kemp that statistics showed that blacks in Georgia were more likely to be sentenced to death than whites, but concluded that the evidence of specific racial discrimination in McCleskey's case was lacking so McCleskey's death sentence was not unconstitutional. However, this decision raised the issue of whether the problem of arbitrary or racist death penalties has been resolved.

== Protocol ==
The CJP is a continuing research program. Its findings are based on a standard protocol of in-depth interviews with past jurors in capital punishment trials. The interviews seek to identify the jury decision-making throughout a trial and identify the ways in which jurors make their sentencing decisions. The CJP was expanded to examine the role played by jurors' race in making death penalty decisions.

This work represents a significant advance over prior studies of jury behavior, most of which have been conducted on samples of students who simulated jury behavior in mock trials. Data collection for CJP is being gathered in the states that have the most variation in death penalty sentencing. Alabama, California, Florida, Georgia, Indiana, Kentucky, Louisiana, Missouri, North Carolina, Pennsylvania, South Carolina, Tennessee, Texas and Virginia were chosen for in-depth juror interviews. As of October 2007, 1198 jurors from 353 capital trials in 14 states have been interviewed.

== Findings ==
Weighing factors in a death penalty case and making a decision "beyond a reasonable doubt" is a complex task with many complicating factors and weighted with moral responsibility. Trials are conducted using legal terms that the jury may not understand. Jurors may be uncertain about their alternatives in making decisions.

=== Expert witnesses ===
The first important paper on the findings of the CJP so far documents that jurors do not rely on expert testimony to evaluate the defendant's dangerousness but are influenced by expert testimony regarding the defendant's mental illness and mental instability. Jurors accept that mental health professionals have expertise on issues of mental illness and tend to accept expert testimony on the subject. However, expert testimony on the potential dangerousness of the defendant was not related to jury opinion. On these issue it appears that jurors rely on common sense since there is no evidence that experts of any kind can predict dangerousness and jurors disregard expert testimony accordingly.

=== Race ===
The findings also show that race is a significant factor. If the defendant is white, the jury is more likely to evaluate him as mentally unstable than if he were black. Also, the jury was more likely to see the defendant as dangerous if the victim were white. Some admit overtly to racial prejudice and some voice seemingly unwitting racially prejudiced beliefs. As noted below, the race of the victim plays a substantial role in whether the jury finds mitigating factors that would allow a lesser sentence than the death penalty.

=== Mitigating factors ===
One review of the CJP data showed that jurors who were asked a hypothetical question regarding how much certain mitigating factors would influence their sentencing decisions were true, 56.2 percent of the jurors would consider a lesser sentence than death if a history of mental illness was presented as a mitigating factor and 73.6 percent would do so if evidence of intellectual disability were presented. However, another review of the data showed the race of the victim had a substantial effect on jury failure to find mitigating factors. If the victim were white there was more failure to find mitigating factors.

=== Jury instructions ===
There is evidence from the study that jurors are confused or misled by the judge's instructions to the jury. Jurors often appear to make decisions from personal experience and personal moral guidelines instead. Findings from jurors interviewed show that 50% of the jurors admit to making death penalty decisions before the death penalty phase of the trial has begun, and 45% did not understand that they could consider any mitigating evidence during the penalty phase, not just the factors listed in the judge's instructions.

In fact, one researcher says that the pattern emerging from the CJP data is that jurors have serious misconceptions about the death penalty process, leading to confusion that produces a bias in favor of the death penalty, and concludes that the CJP research indicates that the jury decision making process is so flawed that it violated constitutional principles.

== See also ==
- Ultimate issue

== General Reference ==
- Capital Jury Project, 1941-2011. M.E. Grenander Department of Special Collections and Archives, University Libraries, University at Albany, State University of New York (hereafter referred to as the Capital Jury Project Records).
