= Writ of attaint =

Obsolete writ in English law

A writ of attaint is an obsolete writ in English law, issued to inquire whether a jury had given a false verdict in a trial.

In criminal cases, the writ of attaint was issued at the suit of the Crown, and in civil cases at the suit of either party. The correctness of the verdict would be determined by a body known as the grand jury of attaint. This panel, consisting of twenty-four members, was twice the size of a normal trial jury. The party bringing the attaint could introduce only the same evidence that was originally given at trial while the jury whose verdict was questioned was allowed to present new matter.

If it were found that an erroneous verdict had been given, the wrong was redressed, and the original jury was punished. The punishment inflicted was quite severe; at the common law, the judgment was:

1. That they should lose their liberam legem (right to give evidence or serve on a jury), and become for ever infamous.
2. That they should forfeit all their goods and chattels.
3. That their lands and tenements should be seized into the king's hands.
4. That their wives and children should be thrown out of doors.
5. That their houses should be razed and thrown down.
6. That their trees should be rooted up.
7. That their meadows should be ploughed.
8. That their bodies should be cast into gaol.

However, during the reign of Henry VIII, Parliament passed the Attaints Act 1531 (23 Hen. 8. c. 3) reducing the punishment to perpetual infamy and a fine.

In criminal cases, it appears to have become obsolete by the end of the 15th century. Procedure by attaint in civil cases had also been gradually giving place to the practice of granting new trials, and after the decision in Bushell's Case in 1670 it became obsolete. The writ was finally abolished by the Juries Act 1825 (6 Geo. 4. c. 50), except as regards jurors guilty of embracery.
