= Jury nullification =

Type of jury verdict in criminal trials

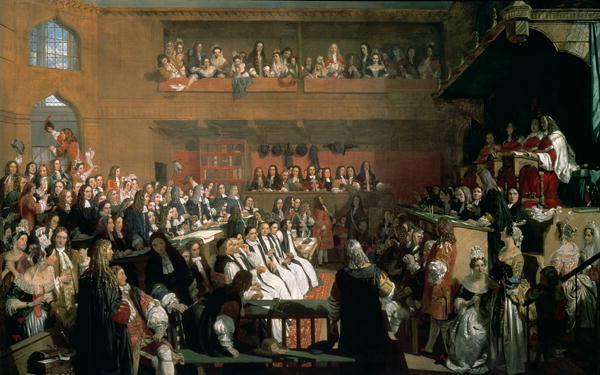
The Trial of the Seven Bishops by John Rogers Herbert

Jury nullification, also known as jury equity or as a perverse verdict, is a decision by the jury in a criminal trial resulting in a verdict of not guilty even though they believe a defendant has broken the law. The jury's reasons may include the belief that the law itself is unjust, that the prosecutor has misapplied the law in the defendant's case, that the punishment for breaking the law is too harsh, or general frustrations with the criminal justice system. It has been commonly used to oppose what jurors perceive as unjust laws, such as American laws that once penalized runaway slaves under the Fugitive Slave Act, prohibited alcohol during Prohibition, or criminalized draft evasion during the Vietnam War. Some juries have also refused to convict due to their own prejudices in favor of the defendant. Such verdicts are possible because a jury has an absolute right to return any verdict it chooses.

Nullification is not an official part of criminal procedure, but is the logical consequence of two rules governing the systems in which it exists:

1. Jurors cannot be punished for the verdict they make.
2. In many jurisdictions, a defendant who is acquitted cannot be tried a second time for the same offense. (At least by the exact same jurisdiction. In the United States, defendants can oftentimes be prosecuted by both the State, and Federal government for what is essentially the same crime under the separate sovereigns doctrine. See Gamble v. United States.)

A jury verdict that is contrary to the letter of the law pertains only to the particular case before it; however, if a pattern of acquittals develops in response to repeated attempts to prosecute a particular offence, this can have the de facto effect of invalidating the law. Such a pattern may indicate public opposition to an unwanted legislative enactment. It may also happen that a jury convicts a defendant even if no law was broken, although such a conviction may be overturned on appeal. Nullification can also occur in civil trials; unlike in criminal trials, if the jury renders a not liable verdict that is clearly at odds with the evidence, the judge can issue a judgment notwithstanding the verdict or order a new trial.

== Background ==
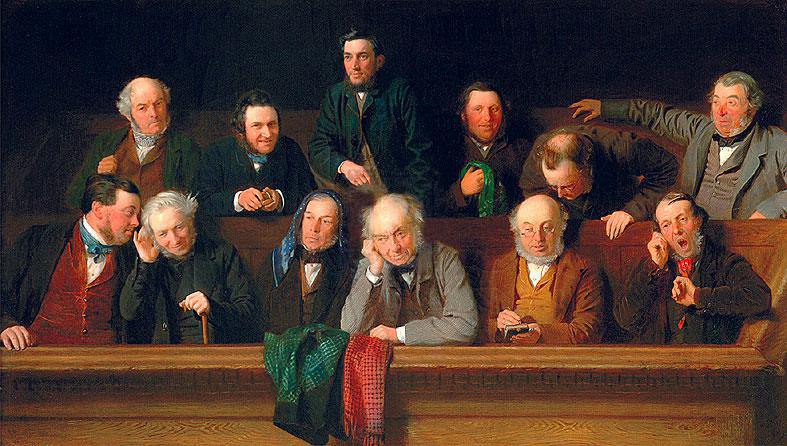
A 19th-century jury

In the past, it was feared that a single judge or panel of government officials might be unduly influenced to follow established legal practice, even when that practice had drifted from its origins. In most modern Western legal systems, judges often instruct juries to act only as "finders of fact", whose role it is to determine the veracity of the evidence presented, the weight accorded to the evidence, to apply that evidence to the law as explained by the judge, and to reach a verdict; but not to question the law itself. Similarly, juries are routinely cautioned by courts and some attorneys not to allow sympathy for a party or other affected persons to compromise the fair and dispassionate evaluation of evidence. These instructions are criticized by advocates of jury nullification. Some commonly cited historical examples of jury nullification involve jurors refusing to convict persons accused of violating the American Fugitive Slave Act by assisting runaway slaves or being fugitive slaves themselves, and refusal of American colonial juries to convict a defendant under English law.

Jury nullification is the source of much debate. Some maintain that it is an important safeguard of last resort against wrongful imprisonment and government tyranny. Some view it as a violation of the right to a jury trial, which undermines the law; whereas others, such as those members of Congress who voted to impeach Supreme Court Justice Samuel Chase for instructing a jury against nullification, view a jury as a body charged with judging both law and fact. Some view it as a violation of the oath sworn by jurors. In the United States, some view the requirement that jurors take an oath to be unlawful in itself, while still others view the oath's reference to "deliverance" to require nullification of unjust law: "will well and truly try and a true deliverance make between the United States and the defendant at the bar, and a true verdict render according to the evidence, so help [me] God". United States v. Green, 556 F.2d 71 (D.C. Cir. 1977).

Some fear that nullification could be used to permit violence against socially unpopular factions. They point to the danger that a jury may choose to convict a defendant who has not broken the letter of the law. However, judges retain the rights both to decide sentences and to disregard juries' guilty verdicts (not guilty verdicts cannot be disregarded), acting as a check against malicious juries. Jury nullification may also occur in civil suits, in which the verdict is generally a finding of liability or lack of liability (rather than a finding of guilty or not guilty).

The main ethical issue involved in jury nullification is the tension between democratic self-government and integrity. The argument has been raised that prosecutors are not allowed to seek jury nullification, and therefore defendants should not be allowed to seek it either; however, for a prosecutor to nullify a law in this context would require negating the presumption of innocence. For this reason, prosecutorial nullification is typically defined as declining to prosecute. Nevertheless, there is little doubt as to the ability of a jury to nullify the law. Today, there are several issues raised by jury nullification, such as:

1. Whether juries can or should be instructed or informed of their power to nullify.
2. Whether a judge may remove jurors "for cause" when they refuse to apply the law as instructed.
3. Whether a judge may punish a juror for practicing jury nullification.
4. Whether all legal arguments, except perhaps on motions in limine to exclude evidence, should be made in the presence of the jury.

In some cases in the United States, a stealth juror will attempt to get on a jury in order to nullify the law. Some lawyers use a shadow defense to expose the jury to information that would otherwise be inadmissible, hoping that evidence will trigger a nullification.

== Common law precedent ==
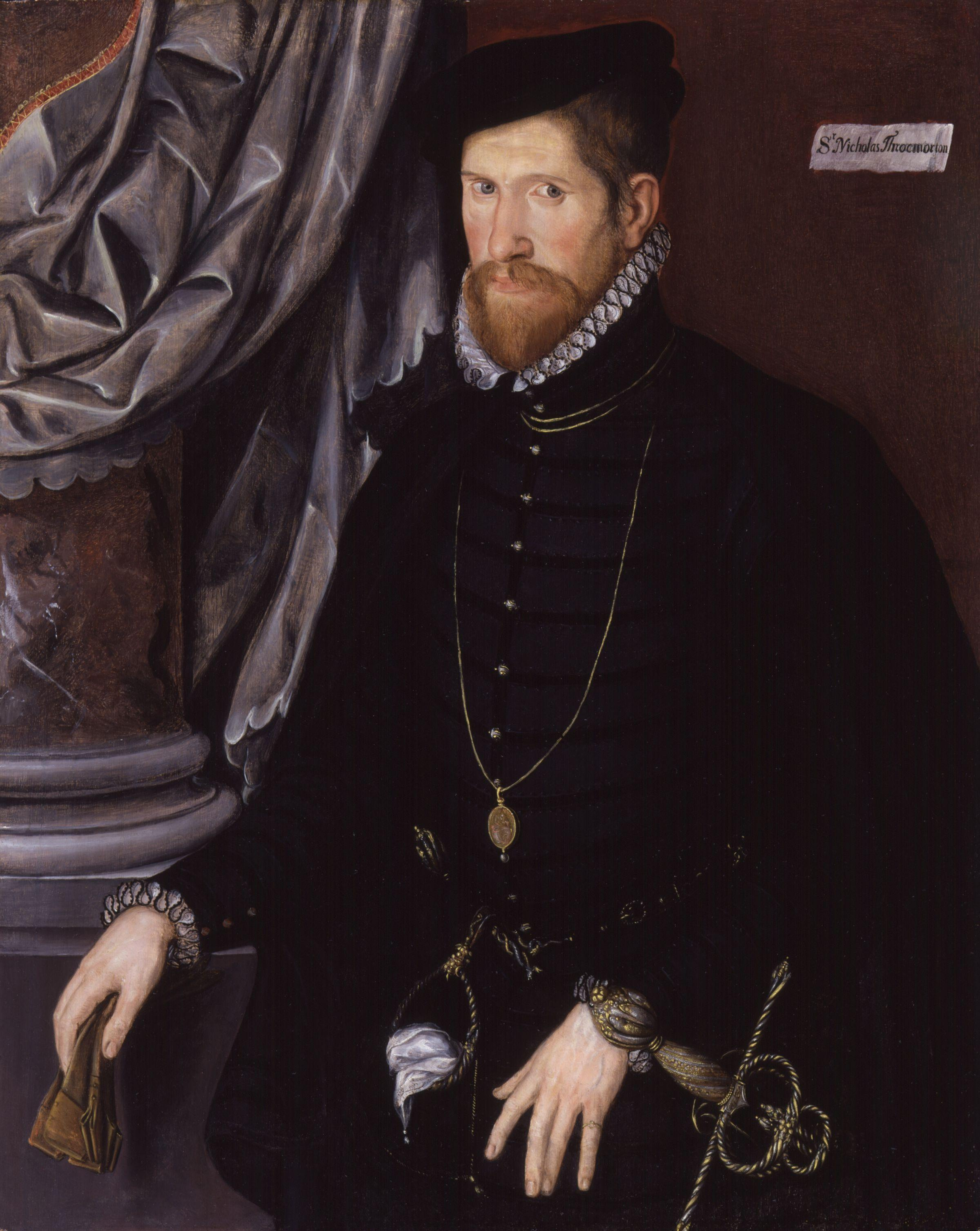
Even prior to Bushel's Case, Sir Nicholas Throckmorton, a non-Episcopalian English Dissenter, or Nonconformist, outside the established Church of England, was acquitted by a jury despite hostility of the judges.

The early history of juries supports the recognition of the de facto power of nullification. By the 12th century, common law courts in England began using juries for more than administrative duties. Juries were composed primarily of "laymen" from the local community and provided a somewhat efficient means of dispute resolution with the benefit of supplying legitimacy. The general power of juries to decide on verdicts was recognised in the English Magna Carta of 1215, which put into words existing practices:

No free man shall be captured, and or imprisoned, or disseised of his freehold, and or of his liberties, or of his free customs, or be outlawed, or exiled, or in any way destroyed, nor will we proceed against him by force or proceed against him by arms, but by the lawful judgment of his peers, or by the law of the land.

For a trivial offence, a free man shall be fined only in proportion to the degree of his offence, and for a serious offence correspondingly, but not so heavily as to deprive him of his livelihood. In the same way, a merchant shall be spared his merchandise, and a husbandman the implements of his husbandry, if they fall upon the mercy of a royal court. None of these fines shall be imposed except by the assessment on oath of reputable men of the neighbourhood.

Largely, the earliest juries returned verdicts in accordance with the wishes of the judge or the Crown. This was achieved either by "packing the jury" or by "writs of attaint". Juries were packed by hand-selecting or by bribing the jury so as to return the desired verdict. That was a common tactic in cases involving treason or sedition. In addition, the writ of attaint allowed a judge to retry the case in front of a second jury when the judge believed the first jury returned a "false verdict". If the second jury returned a different verdict, that verdict was imposed, and the first jury was imprisoned or fined.

That history is marked by a number of notable exceptions, several of which claim rights commonly recognized as fundamental in modern democratic societies, such as freedom of speech and of the press, and freedom of religious practice. In 1554, a jury acquitted Sir Nicholas Throckmorton but was severely punished by the court. Almost a century later, in 1649, in the first known attempt to argue for jury nullification, a jury likewise acquitted John Lilburne for his part in inciting a rebellion against Oliver Cromwell's regime. Lilburne had been charged with seditious libel for the publication of articles critical of the government; the jury were instructed to give a verdict only on whether the text was published, and to leave the issue of libel to the judge, while Lilburne argued the jury should give a general verdict and should judge whether the law's restraint on speech against the government was just. The theoretician and politician Eduard Bernstein wrote of Lilburne's trial:

His contention that the constitution of the Court was contrary to the fundamental laws of the country was unheeded, and his claim that the jury was legally entitled to judge not only as to matters of fact but also as to the application of the law itself, as the Judges represented only 'Norman intruders', whom the jury might here ignore in reaching a verdict, was described by an enraged judge as 'damnable, blasphemous heresy'. This view was not shared by the jury, which, after three days' hearing, acquitted Lilburne—who had defended himself as skillfully as any lawyer could have done—to the great horror of the Judges and the chagrin of the majority of the Council of State. The Judges were so astonished at the verdict of the jury that they had to repeat their question before they would believe their ears, but the public which crowded the judgment hall, on the announcement of the verdict, broke out into cheers so loud and long as, according to the unanimous testimony of contemporary reporters, had never before been heard in the Guildhall. The cheering and waving of caps continued for over half an hour, while the Judges sat, turning white and red in turns, and spread thence to the masses in London and the suburbs. At night bonfires were lighted, and even during the following days the event was the occasion of joyful demonstrations.

In 1653, Lilburne was on trial again and asked the jury to acquit him if it found the death penalty "unconscionably severe" in proportion to the crime he had committed. The jury found Lilburne "not guilty of any crime worthy of death". In 1670, a petit jury refused to convict William Penn of unlawful assembly for religious practice not associated with the Church of England. The judge held the jury in contempt of court, which was ruled inappropriate by the Court of Common Pleas in Bushel's Case. In 1681, a grand jury refused to indict the Earl of Shaftesbury. In 1688, a jury acquitted the Seven Bishops of the Church of England of seditious libel. Juries continued, even in non-criminal cases, to act in defiance of the Crown. In 1763 and 1765, juries awarded £4,000 to John Wilkes and £300 to John Entick in separate suits for trespass against the Crown's messengers. In both cases, messengers had been sent by Lord Halifax to seize allegedly-libellous papers.

In Scotland, jury nullification had the profound effect of introducing the three-verdict system including the option of "not proven", which remained in Scotland until 2025. In 1728, Carnegie of Finhaven accidentally killed the Earl of Strathmore. As the defendant had undoubtedly killed the Earl, the law, as it then stood, required the jury merely to look at the facts and to pass a verdict of "proven" or "not proven", depending on whether it believed that the facts proved the defendant had killed the Earl. If the jury brought in a "proven" verdict, that would lead to Carnegie's hanging though he had not intended any harm to the Earl. To avert that injustice, the jury decided to assert what it believed to be its "ancient right" to judge the whole case, not just the facts, and rendered the verdict of "not proven". Over time, juries have tended to favour the "not guilty" verdict over "not proven" and so the interpretation has changed. The "not guilty" verdict has become the normal verdict when a jury is convinced of innocence, and the "not proven" verdict is used only if the jury is not certain of innocence or guilt.. The not proven verdict was abolished on 1 January 2025 as part of justice reforms introduced by the Scottish Parliament to "create a clearer, fairer and more transparent decision-making process".

The standard jury trial practice in the United States during the Founding Era and for several decades afterward was to argue all issues of law in the presence of the jury so that it heard the same arguments as the bench in reaching its rulings on motions. That is evidenced by such decisions as the 1839 case Stettinius, which held, "The defense can argue law to the jury before the court gives instructions." Later, judges began to demand the parties submit motions in writing, often before the jury was empaneled, to be argued and decided without the jury being present. The transition began with motions in limine to exclude evidence on which it was felt the jury should not hear the argument because it would be informed of the evidence to be excluded. Later, that was expanded to include all legal argument and so that today, the earlier practice of arguing law before the jury has been largely forgotten, and judges even declare mistrials or overturn verdicts if legal arguments are made to the jury.

== Specific jurisdictions ==
=== Canada ===
Although extremely rare, jury nullification occurs in Canada. As the prosecution has powers to appeal the resulting acquittal, it lacks the finality found in the United States. However, the Crown cannot appeal on grounds of an unreasonable acquittal although it can appeal on errors of law. In R. v. Latimer, 2001 SCC 1, the Supreme Court discussed jury nullification and indicated that it is a duty of the presiding justice to try to prevent it from occurring. Perhaps the most famous cases of jury nullification in Canada were the various trials of Henry Morgentaler, who openly operated a private abortion clinic in violation of the Criminal Code. Repeated attempts at prosecuting Morgentaler resulted in acquittals at jury trials in the 1970s and the 1980s. In the 1988 Supreme Court case, R. v. Morgentaler, 1988 SCR 30, a nullification was appealed all the way to the country's highest court, which struck down the law in question. In obiter dicta, Chief Justice Dickson wrote:

The contrary principle contended for by Mr. Manning, that a jury may be encouraged to ignore a law it does not like, could lead to gross inequities. One accused could be convicted by a jury who supported the existing law, while another person indicted for the same offence could be acquitted by a jury who, with reformist zeal, wished to express disapproval of the same law. Moreover, a jury could decide that although the law pointed to a conviction, the jury would simply refuse to apply the law to an accused for whom it had sympathy. Alternatively, a jury who feels antipathy towards an accused might convict despite a law which points to acquittal. To give a harsh, but I think telling example, a jury fueled by the passions of racism could be told that they need not apply the law against murder to a white man who had killed a black man. Such a possibility need only be stated to reveal the potentially frightening implications of Mr. Manning's assertions.... It is no doubt true that juries have a de facto power to disregard the law as stated to the jury by the judge. We cannot enter the jury room. The jury is never called upon to explain the reasons which lie behind a verdict. It may even be true that in some limited circumstances the private decision of a jury to refuse to apply the law will constitute, in the words of a Law Reform Commission of Canada working paper, "the citizen's ultimate protection against oppressive laws and the oppressive enforcement of the law" (Law Reform Commission of Canada, Working Paper 27, The Jury in Criminal Trials (1980)). But recognizing this reality is a far cry from suggesting that counsel may encourage a jury to ignore a law they do not support or to tell a jury that it has a right to do so.

The Supreme Court in 2006 issued a decision, R. v. Krieger, 2006 SCC 47, which confirmed that juries in Canada have the power to refuse to apply the law when their consciences require that they do so. The decision stated that "juries are not entitled as a matter of right to refuse to apply the law—but they do have the power to do so when their consciences permit of no other course".

=== England and Wales ===
By the late 17th century, the court's power to punish juries was removed in Bushel's Case involving a juror on the case against William Penn. Penn and William Mead had been arrested in 1670 for illegally preaching a Quaker sermon and disturbing the peace but four jurors, led by Edward Bushell, refused to find them guilty. Instead of dismissing the jury, the judge sent them back for further deliberations. Despite the judge demanding a guilty verdict, the jury now unanimously found Penn guilty of preaching but acquitted him on the charge of disturbing the peace and acquitted Mead of all charges. The jury was then subsequently kept for three days without "meat, drink, fire and tobacco" to force it to bring in a guilty verdict. When it failed to do so, the judge ended the trial. As punishment, the judge ordered the jurors imprisoned until they paid a fine to the court.

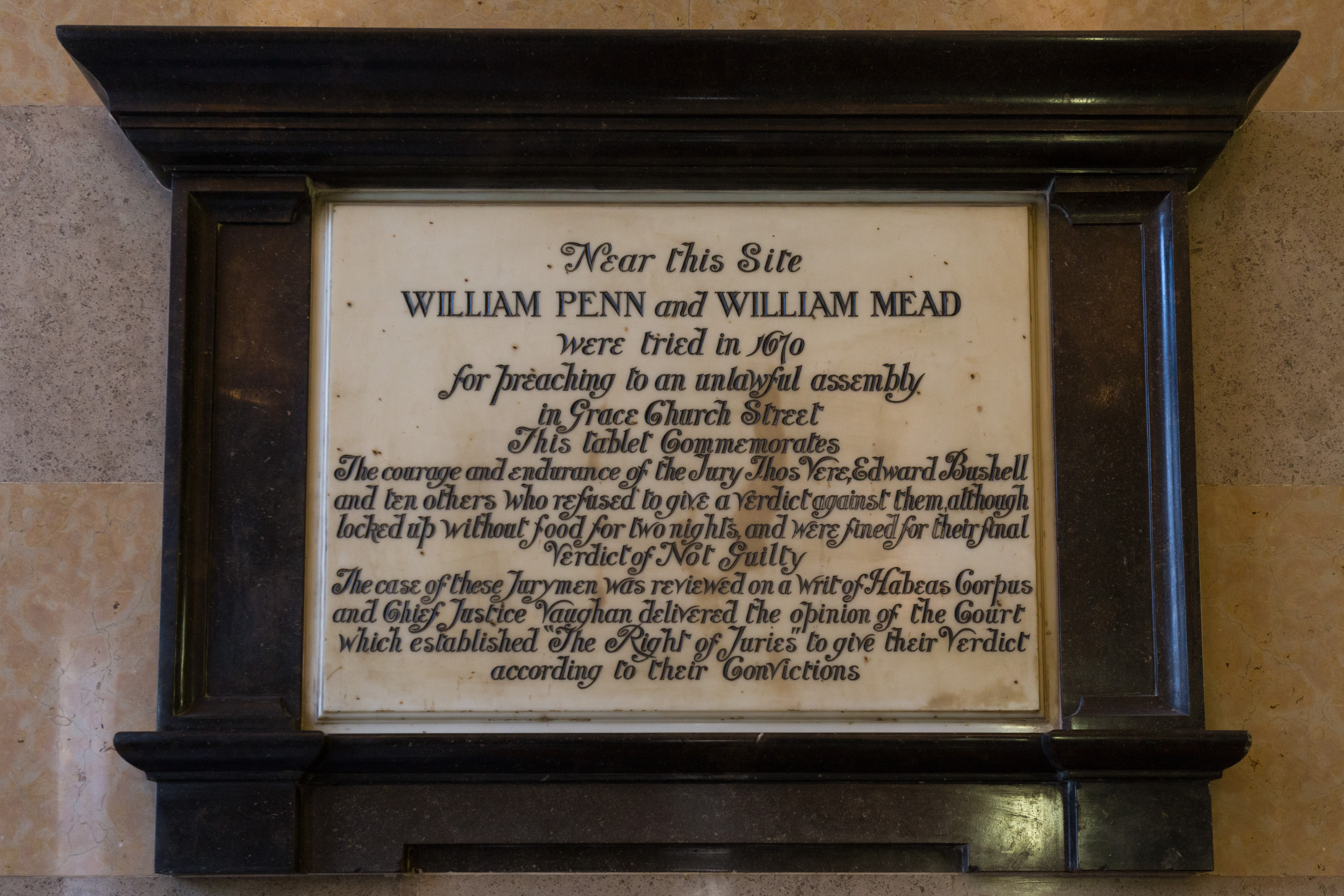
Plaque at the Old Bailey

Four jurors refused to pay the fine, and after several months, Bushell sought a writ of habeas corpus. Chief Justice Vaughan, sitting on the Court of Common Pleas, discharged the writ, released them, called the power to punish a jury "absurd" and forbade judges from punishing jurors for returning a verdict the judge disagreed with. That series of events is considered a significant milestone in the history of jury nullification. The "courage and endurance" of the jury is celebrated in a plaque displayed in the Central Criminal Court (the Old Bailey) in London. In a criminal libel case, R. v. Shipley (1784), 4 Dougl. 73, 99 E.R. 774, at p. 824, Lord Mansfield, sitting as a judge in the case, disparaged the practice of jury nullification:

So the jury who usurp the judicature of law, though they happen to be right, are themselves wrong, because they are right by chance only, and have not taken the constitutional way of deciding the question. It is the duty of the Judge, in all cases of general justice, to tell the jury how to do right, though they have it in their power to do wrong, which is a matter entirely between God and their own consciences.

To be free is to live under a government by law.... Miserable is the condition of individuals, dangerous is the condition of the State, if there is no certain law, or, which is the same thing, no certain administration of law, to protect individuals, or to guard the State.

...

In opposition to this, what is contended for? – That the law shall be, in every particular cause, what any twelve men, who shall happen to be the jury, shall be inclined to think; liable to no review, and subject to no control, under all the prejudices of the popular cry of the day, and under all the bias of interest in this town, where thousands, more or less, are concerned in the publication of newspapers, paragraphs, and pamphlets. Under such an administration of law, no man could tell, no counsel could advise, whether a paper was or was not punishable [for publishing a libel].

A 2016 study exploring the history of juror punishment in England and Wales after Bushel's Case found no clear examples of jurors being punished solely for returning the "wrong" verdict. The closest that a jury came to that was in 1917, when a jury acquitted two teenage boys of arson. The boys had confessed at their pre-trial hearing but entered pleas of not guilty at their trial. Home Office civil servants suspected the difference between the pleas could be explained by the difference between the boys' admitting that they had caused the fire and their denial that they had done so maliciously. The trial judge did not consider that possibility or was not satisfied with it. On receiving the jury's verdict, he told them that "you have been absolutely regardless of your oath. These men have pleaded guilty, and the evidence is of the clearest possible nature. You are none of you fit to serve on a Jury, but you will remain here until the end of the Sessions". The foreman, George Lathan, considered that a form of punishment for the jury, as the jurors were not going to be permitted to serve on any more juries but were nonetheless required to keep attending court or face contempt proceedings, which Lathan considered a tacit form of imprisonment. Officials in the Lord Chancellor's Office noted that while the judge's conduct "was ill-judged and arbitrary, he did not, so far as I can see, do any act which would justify the Lord Chancellor in removing him from the Bench". Home Office officials wrote to the judge, advising him that his actions "would be impossible for the Home Secretary to defend as constitutional or right", and after several days, the jurors were relieved of their duties. Home Office minutes suggest they did not think that kind of informal punishment of jurors who had returned the "wrong" verdict to be unheard of.

In 1982, during the Falklands War, the Royal Navy sank the Argentine cruiser, General Belgrano. Three years later a civil servant, Clive Ponting, leaked two government documents concerning the sinking of the cruiser to a Member of Parliament (Tam Dalyell) and was subsequently charged with breaching section 2 of the Official Secrets Act 1911. The prosecution in the case demanded that the jury convict Ponting, as he had clearly contravened the Act by leaking official information about the sinking of the Belgrano during the Falklands War. His main defence was that it was in the public interest that the information be made available. The judge, Sir Anthony McCowan, "indicated that the jury should convict him", and had ruled that "the public interest is what the government of the day says it is". The jury acquitted him instead, much to the consternation of the government.

In 2001, two people were charged with conspiracy to cause criminal damage to a Trident submarine in a Barrow-in-Furness shipyard. Though the two admitted their intention to trash the submarine, the two said they were planning to do so due to nuclear bombs being immoral and illegal. The judge told the juries that such ideals were not a defence against the charge. The jury brought a verdict of not guilty on these two anti-nuclear protesters.

In 2021, six activists associated with the environmental protest organisation Extinction Rebellion were tried for causing criminal damage to the British headquarters of the multinational oil company Royal Dutch Shell. The judge told the jury that there was 'no defence in law' for the protestors' actions, which according to the prosecutor had caused 'significant damage' to the building, but the activists were acquitted.

In 2023, Insulate Britain members Giovanna Lewis and Amy Pritchard were jailed for seven weeks after defying the judge's ban on informing the jury of the reasons for their actions. In charging them with contempt, the judge referred to an earlier case where another environmental activist was sentenced to eight weeks in prison for the same reason. Following juries acquitting activists, dozens of people have been threatened with arrest for displaying signs that remind jurors of their right to make decisions based on conscience.

In 2024, a motion brought by government lawyers to prosecute the activist Trudi Warner for holding a placard stating the right to jury nullification was thrown out by a High Court judge on the basis that there was a well-established principle in law of jury equity and Warner had not broken any law. Warner's placard had directly referenced the wording on the plaque inside the Old Bailey.

In 2026, leading human rights barrister Rajiv Menon KC was prosecuted for contempt of court for, among other things, referring to the concept of "jury equity" in his closing remarks while representing Charlotte Head in the trial of the "Filton 6" protesters. Senior lawyers and legal figures warned that the prosecution would have a chilling effect across the bar.

On 22 July 2026, Riel Karmy-Jones KC. Chair of the Criminal Bar Association, said that the prosecution is already impacting the work of criminal defence lawyers, with them "changing their speeches or being told to change them".

Writing in The Guardian, leading criminal solicitor Imran Khan KC noted that the prosecution would weaken the willingness and ability of defence counsel to make the case for the defence as forcefully as possible, and so would potentially increase the risk of wrongful convictions and unfair trials.

In an interview in The Observer in August 2026, Menon denied that he attempted to persuade the jury to disregard the judge's rulings in the case, and denied that he mentioned the concept of jury equity to the jury, saying that he simply quoted from the plaque displayed in the Old Bailey. The article goes on to quote Kirsty Brimelow KC, chair of the Bar Council, as saying that a barrister "has a duty to represent their clients fearlessly and judge-instigated contempt proceedings risk a chilling effect on the profession.”

The hearing was originally scheduled to take place under Mrs Justice Cheema-Grubb on 28 July 2026. However, on 24 July 2026, the High Court of England and Wales ruled that an appeal challenging the jurisdiction of the High Court to rule on contempt should be allowed to proceed, resulting in an adjournment of proceedings until such time as the appeal could be heard.

=== Germany ===
In 1921, an Armenian genocide survivor, Soghomon Tehlirian, assassinated Talaat Pasha, who was considered the main architect of the genocide, in Berlin. Although Tehlirian's lawyers did not contest that their client had killed Talaat, the jury (Germany used jury trials until 1924) returned a verdict of not guilty. However, although the moral dimension of the case was strongly emphasised by the defense, the acquittal was based on a plea of temporary insanity and there was no dissent between court and jury.

=== United States ===
In the United States, jury nullification first appeared just before the American Revolutionary War, when colonial juries frequently exercised their nullification power, principally in maritime cases and cases implicating free speech. Jury nullification became so common that many British prosecutors gave up trying maritime cases since conviction seemed hopeless. Before the American Civil War, juries sometimes refused to convict for violations of the Fugitive Slave Act. Later, during Prohibition, juries often nullified alcohol control laws. That resistance may have contributed to the adoption of the Twenty-first Amendment, which repealed Prohibition and the Eighteenth Amendment.

In a well-known example of jury nullification, at the end of Wild Bill Hickok's trial for the manslaughter of Davis Tutt in 1865, Judge Sempronius Boyd gave the jury two instructions. He first instructed the jury that a conviction was its only option under the law. He then instructed them that they could apply the unwritten law of the "fair fight" and acquit. Hickok was acquitted; the verdict was not necessarily universally popular with the press and public. There have been contemporary instances of activists being arrested for informing jurists of their right of jury nullification in front of court houses, with subsequent rulings that arresting people for this activity is unconstitutional.

==== Fugitive Slave Act ====
Juries across the North acquitted defendants who had clearly breached the Fugitive Slave Act in the 1850s. Part of the Compromise of 1850, it had been passed to mollify Southern slaveowners, who were otherwise threatening to secede from the Union. Secretary of State Daniel Webster was a key supporter of the law as expressed in his famous "Seventh of March" speech. He wanted high-profile convictions, but the jury nullifications ruined his presidential aspirations and his last-ditch efforts to find a compromise between North and South. Webster led the prosecution when defendants were accused of rescuing Shadrach Minkins in 1851 from Boston officials who intended to return Minkins to his owner. The juries convicted none of the men. Webster tried to enforce a law that was extremely unpopular in the North, and his Whig Party passed over him again when it chose a presidential nominee in 1852.

==== After Civil War ====
White defendants accused of crimes against black people and other minorities were often acquitted by all-white juries, especially in the South, even in the face of irrefutable evidence. An example is the trial of Roy Bryant and J. W. Milam.

The 1995 acquittal of O. J. Simpson prompted debate over whether the verdict was an instance of jury nullification. Contemporary commentators raised the possibility that jurors had acquitted Simpson in response to concerns about racism and misconduct in the Los Angeles Police Department, rather than solely on their assessment of the evidence presented at trial. Jurors who spoke publicly attributed the verdict to reasonable doubt, while legal scholars have disagreed over whether the acquittal should be characterized as jury nullification.

==== 21st century ====
In the 21st century, many discussions of jury nullification center on drug laws, which some consider unjust in principle or because they are seen to discriminate against certain groups. A jury nullification advocacy group estimated in 2016 that 3–4% of all jury trials involve nullification. Jury nullification among NYC jurors in regards to the Luigi Mangione case has been a subject of debate.

==== Judicial opinion ====
In the 1895 case of Sparf v. United States, written by Associate Justice John Marshall Harlan, the US Supreme Court held 5-4 that a trial judge has no responsibility to inform the jury of the right to nullify laws. That decision, often cited, has led to a common practice by US judges to penalize anyone who attempts to present a nullification argument to jurors and to declare a mistrial if such argument has been presented to them. In some states, jurors are likely to be struck from the panel during voir dire if they do not agree to accept as correct the rulings and instructions of the law as provided by the judge.

In later rulings, the courts continued to prohibit informing juries about jury nullification. In a 1969, Fourth Circuit Court of Appeals decision, U.S. v. Moylan, 417 F.2d 1002 (4th Cir.1969), the Court affirmed the concept of jury nullification, but upheld the power of a court to refuse to permit an instruction to the jury to this effect. In 1972, in United States v. Dougherty, 473 F.2d 1113, the United States Court of Appeals for the District of Columbia Circuit issued a ruling similar to Moylan that affirmed the de facto power of a jury to nullify the law but upheld the denial of the defense's chance to instruct the jury about the power to nullify.

In 1988, the Sixth Circuit upheld a jury instruction: "There is no such thing as valid jury nullification." In United States v. Thomas (1997), the Second Circuit ruled that jurors can be removed if there is evidence that they intend to nullify the law. The Supreme Court has not recently confronted the issue of jury nullification. In 2017, a jury was instructed: "You cannot substitute your sense of justice, whatever that means, for your duty to follow the law, whether you agree with it or not. It is not for you to determine whether the law is just or whether the law is unjust. That cannot be your task. There is no such thing as valid jury nullification. You would violate your oath and the law if you willfully brought a verdict contrary to the law given to you in this case." The Ninth Circuit upheld the first three sentences of the jury's instruction and overruled the remainder but deemed that instruction a harmless error and affirmed the conviction.

==== State laws ====
In 2002, South Dakota voters rejected by a 78% margin a state constitutional amendment to permit criminal defendants to argue for jury nullification. On June 18, 2012, the New Hampshire General Court enacted a law explicitly allowing defense attorneys to inform juries about jury nullification. On October 24, 2014, the New Hampshire Supreme Court effectively nullified the law and held that the wording of the statute does not allow defense attorneys to tell juries they can nullify a law. The Maryland State Constitution, Declaration of Rights, states that "in the trial of all criminal cases, the Jury shall be the Judges of Law, as well as of fact, except that the Court may pass upon the sufficiency of the evidence to sustain a conviction." Nevertheless, the Maryland Courts jury service brochure states that "it is your duty to accept what the judge is saying about the law, and how it is to be applied to the case."

== See also ==
- Citizens Rule Book
- Error of impunity
- Fully Informed Jury Association
- Josephine Terranova
- Judgment notwithstanding verdict
- Judicial override
- Juror misconduct
- Jury nullification in the United States
- Miscarriage of justice
- Ultimate fact
