= United States v. Moylan =

US court case

- Court: United States Court of Appeals for the Fourth Circuit
- Full case name: United States v. Moylan, 417 F.2d 1002, 1003 (4th Cir. 1969)
- Argued: June 10, 1969
- Decided: October 15, 1969

Holding
- Juries have the power to acquit even when the case has been proven (jury nullification), but courts may prohibit attorneys from encouraging or explaining it to jurors at trial.

Court membership
- Judges sitting: Clement Haynsworth, Chief Judge, Simon Sobeloff and Harrison Lee Winter, Circuit Judges. (4th Cir.)

United States v. Moylan, 417 F.2d 1002, 1003 (4th Cir. 1969), was a United States Court of Appeals for the Fourth Circuit case affirming a district court's refusal to permit defense counsel to argue for jury nullification.

== Background ==
Mary Moylan and seven others entered the office of the local draft board in Catonsville, Maryland on May 17, 1968, removed approximately 378 files, and took them to an adjacent parking lot where they burned the files with homemade napalm. They admitted committing these acts as a protest against the war in Vietnam. They were indicted, tried, and convicted in Federal district court and then appealed the conviction to the Fourth Circuit Court of Appeals.

The appellants based their appeal on asserted errors in the trial court's instructions to the jury. Their two claims were:

1. The trial court erred on the definition of criminal intent and the meaning of "willfully"; they argued for a more expansive interpretation of the word "willful", i.e. that no violation occurred unless defendants performed the admitted acts with a bad purpose or motive. Since they acted from good motives (to protest a war which they sincerely believed was not only illegal but immoral) they could not have "willfully" violated the statutes.
2. The trial judge should have informed the jury that it had the power to acquit the defendants even if they were clearly guilty of the offenses under the letter of the law, or at least the court should have permitted their attorney to explain that to the jury.

== Decision ==
The appeals court issued its decision on October 15, 1969 by a unanimous 3–0 majority, with Judge Sobeloff giving the majority opinion affirming the district court's conviction.

They rejected the first claim:

To read the term "willfully" to require a bad purpose would be to confuse the concept of intent with that of motive. The statutory requirement of willfulness is satisfied if the accused acted intentionally, with knowledge that he was breaching the statute.

They also rejected the second claim. While conceding that the jury has the power to acquit even if that verdict is contrary to the law and evidence, informing the jury that they have that power is neither necessary nor desirable:

We recognize, as appellants urge, the undisputed power of the jury to acquit, even if its verdict is contrary to the law as given by the judge and contrary to the evidence. This is a power that must exist as long as we adhere to the general verdict in criminal cases, for the courts cannot search the minds of the jurors to find the basis upon which they judge. If the jury feels that the law under which the defendant is accused is unjust, or that exigent circumstances justified the actions of the accused, or for any reason which appeals to their logic or passion, the jury has the power to acquit, and the courts must abide by that decision.

...However, this is not to say that the jury should be encouraged in their "lawlessness", and by clearly stating to the jury that they may disregard the law, telling them that they may decide according to their prejudices or consciences (for there is no check to insure that the judgment is based upon conscience rather than prejudice), we would indeed be negating the rule of law in favor of the rule of lawlessness. This should not be allowed.

== See also ==
- Sparf and Hansen v. United States

== See also ==
- Jury nullification
