= Constitution Society =

Non-profit educational organization

Coordinates: 30.3596°N 97.7365°W

The Constitution Society is a nonprofit educational organization headquartered at San Antonio, Texas, U.S., and founded in 1994 by Jon Roland, an author and computer specialist who has run for public office as a Libertarian Party candidate on a "Constitutionalist Platform". The society publishes online a large selection of works on constitutional history, law, and government.

== Web site ==
The society’s web site features digital library resources including the online Liberty Library of Constitutional Classics, launched for the purpose of hosting complete, annotated, and cross-linked copies of most of the major works written or read by the American Founders, or by persons whose writings can enable one to understand their writings. As of April 2011, it had an Alexa Traffic Rank of 78,617, with 2943 links in. It also has documents from other countries.

The ideological orientation of the site ranges from libertarian to militia support.

According to a 2010 Southern Poverty Law Center report, the site also links to conspiracy-theory sites "questioning the Oklahoma City bombing and the role of researchers in creating the HIV virus", and carries "a section on mind-control technology". Roland himself has stated that "The Feds... have actually been engaging in warlike activity against the American people." Roland also reportedly advocates the abolition of paper money in favor of gold or silver coin. Since at least 1996, Roland has held that "U.S. citizens have the right to resist an unlawful arrest", a claim assessed by Snopes as "Mostly False".

== See also ==
- Federalist Society
- Cato Institute
- Constitution Party (United States)
- Liberty Fund
- Institute for Justice
- Independent Institute
- Independence Institute
