= Trier of fact =

In a legal proceeding, those who decide if an event occurred based on evidence

In law, a trier of fact or finder of fact is a person or group who determines disputed issues of fact in a legal proceeding (usually a trial) and how relevant they are to deciding its outcome. To determine a fact is to decide, from the evidence presented, whether something existed or some event occurred.

The factfinder differs by the type of proceeding. In a jury trial, it is the jury; in a non-jury trial, the judge is both the factfinder and the trier of law. In administrative proceedings, the factfinder may be a hearing officer or a hearing body.

== Juries ==
In a jury trial, a jury is the trier of fact. The jury finds the facts and applies them to the relevant statute or law it is instructed by the judge to use to reach its verdict. Thus, in a jury trial, the jury makes the findings of fact while the judge makes legal rulings as to what evidence will be heard by the jury and what legal framework governs the case. Jurors are instructed to follow the law as given by the judge strictly but are in no way obligated to do so. This sometimes leads to jury nullification, where the jury's verdict differs from the law.

In Anglo-American–based legal systems, a finding of fact made by the jury is not appealable unless clearly wrong to any reasonable person. This principle is enshrined in the Seventh Amendment to the United States Constitution, which provides that "no fact tried by a jury, shall be otherwise re-examined in any Court of the United States, than according to the rules of the common law".

== Judges ==
In a bench trial, judges are professional triers of fact. In a bench trial, the judge makes findings of fact and rulings of law. The findings of a judge of first instance are not normally disturbed by an appellate court.

== Administrative law judges ==
In the U.S., an administrative law judge (ALJ) both presides over trials (and makes rulings of law) and adjudicates the claims or disputes (in other words, ALJ-controlled proceedings are bench trials) involving administrative law, but ALJs are not part of an independent judiciary.

== Mixed systems ==
In mixed systems, such as the judiciary of Germany, a mixture of both judges and lay judges are triers of fact.

== See also ==
- Conclusions of law
- Frye standard
