= Vicinage Clause =

Portion of the sixth amendment to the US Constitution

The Vicinage Clause is a provision in the Sixth Amendment to the United States Constitution regulating the vicinity from which a jury pool may be selected. The clause says that the accused shall be entitled to an "impartial jury of the State and district wherein the crime shall have been committed, which district shall have been previously ascertained by law". The Vicinage Clause limits the vicinity of criminal jury selection to both the state and the federal judicial district where the crime has been committed. This is distinct from the venue provision of Article Three of the United States Constitution, which regulates the location of the actual trial.

The Vicinage clause has its roots in medieval English criminal procedure, the perceived abuses of criminal vicinage and venue during the colonial period (when trials for treason were being held in England rather than in the colony where the crime is alleged to have happened) and Anti-federalist objections to the United States Constitution. The clause is one of the few constitutional criminal procedure provisions that has not been incorporated to apply to proceedings in state courts, the other being the Grand Jury Clause of the Fifth Amendment.

The Clause has led to very little litigation, in part because of its overlap (as a practical matter) with the venue provision of Article Three and Rule 18 of the Federal Rules of Criminal Procedure. Further, with the exception of the Court for the District of Wyoming, whose district includes the portions of Yellowstone National Park in Idaho and Montana, no federal judicial district includes the territory of two or more states (except, historically, the District of Potomac, which existed from February 1801 to March 1802).

== Background ==
=== English law during the Colonial period ===
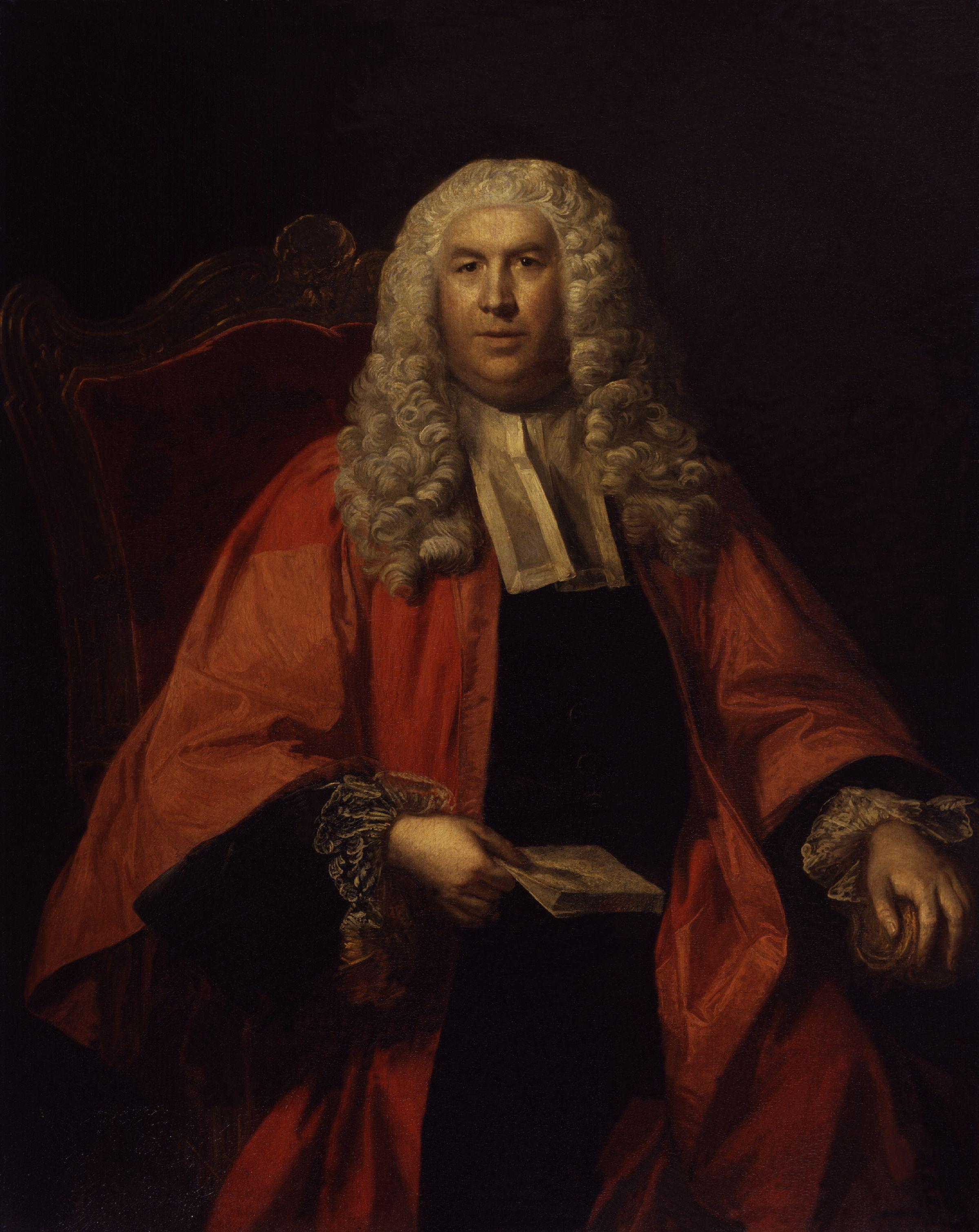
Blackstone wrote that English juries must be composed of residents of the county.

The Oxford English Dictionary defines "vicinage" as "A number of places lying near to each other taken collectively; an area extending to a limited distance round a particular spot; a neighbourhood." The OED cites Thomas Fuller's Church History (1655): "King Ethelred . . . began the tryal of Causes by a Jury of twelve men to be chosen out of the Vicenage." According to Blackstone, in medieval England, the "vicinage of the jury" referred to a jury drawn from the relevant county.

A 1543 statute of Henry VIII of England permits treason committed outside the "realm" to be tried "before such commissioners, and in such shire of the realm, as shall be assigned by the King's majesty's commission." Parliament renewed the statute in 1769. This law was used to try colonists accused of treason in England.

A 1772 statute of George III of the United Kingdom permits destruction of dockyards, magazines, ships, ammunition, and supplies committed outside the "realm" to be tried in any "shire or county within this realm". A 1772 statute permitted capital crimes committed in Massachusetts to be tried in England or a neighboring province if "an indifferent trial cannot be had within" Massachusetts.

=== Protests from the Revolutionary period ===
The Virginia House of Burgesses condemned the renewal of the treason law on May 16, 1769 in the Virginia Resolves:

[A]ll Trials for Treason, Misprison for Treason, and for any Felony or Crime whatsoever, committed and done in this his Majesty's said Colony and Dominion, by any Person or Persons residing therein, ought of right to be had, and conducted in and before his Majesty's Courts, held within the said Colony, according to the fixed and known Course of Proceedings; and that the seizing of any Person or Persons, residing in this Colony, suspected of any Crime whatsoever, committed therein, and sending such Person or Persons to Places beyond the Sea, to be tried, is highly derogatory of the Rights of British subjects . . . .

The same resolution referred to the "inestimable Privilege of being tried by a Jury from the Vicinage."

The Declaration and Resolves of the First Continental Congress adopted on October 14, 1774, resolved:

That the respective colonies are entitled to the common law of England, and more especially to the great and inestimable privilege of being tried by their peers of the vicinage, according to the course of that law.

On October 26, 1774, the Continental Congress approved an address to the people of Quebec, drafted by Thomas Cushing, Richard Henry Lee, and John Dickinson, arguing that:

[One] great right is that of trial by jury. This provides, that neither life, liberty nor property, can be taken from the possessor, until twelve of his unexceptionable countrymen and peers of his vicinage, who from that neighbourhood may reasonably be supposed to be acquainted with his character, and the characters of the witnesses . . . .

The United States Declaration of Independence (1776) accuses King George III of "transporting us beyond seas to be tried for pretended offences".

=== Drafting of the Constitution ===
The New Jersey Plan contained a provision that: "[N]o person shall be liable to be tried for any criminal offense, committed within any of the United States, in any other state than that wherein the offense shall be committed . . . ." The proposals of Alexander Hamilton and Charles Cotesworth Pinckney were similar. The Committee of Detail and Committee of the Whole amended this language and included it within Article Three, Section Two, Clause Three. Article III provides: "The Trial of all Crimes . . . shall be held in the State where the said Crimes shall have been committed." This provision received almost no debate in the Constitutional Convention.

The omission of a vicinage right from the United States Constitution was among the objections of the Anti-federalists to the ratification of the Constitution. James Madison explained the omission of a vicinage clause in the Virginia Ratifying Convention as follows:

It was objected yesterday, that there was no provision for a jury from the vicinage. If it could have been done with safety, it would not have been opposed. It might so happen that a trial would be impracticable in the county. Suppose a rebellion in a whole district, would it not be impossible to get a jury? The trial by jury is held as sacred in England as in America. There are deviations of it in England: yet greater deviations have happened here since we established our independence, than have taken place there for a long time, though it be left to the legislative discretion. It is a misfortune in any case that this trial should be departed from, yet in some cases it is necessary. It must be therefore left to the discretion of the legislature to modify it according to circumstances. This is a complete and satisfactory answer.

Virginia ratified the Constitution, with a proviso that a Bill of Rights, including a right to "trial by an impartial jury of his vicinage", be added by amendment. North Carolina adopted the same proviso as Virginia, but refused to ratify the Constitution in its absence. New York and Rhode Island ratified the constitution with similar provisos as Virginia (but, in the case of Rhode Island, the Sixth Amendment had already been sent to the states for ratification). The ratifying provisos of Massachusetts did not include a vicinage right; a proviso including a vicinage right was considered and rejected in Pennsylvania.

== Drafting of the Clause ==
=== House ===
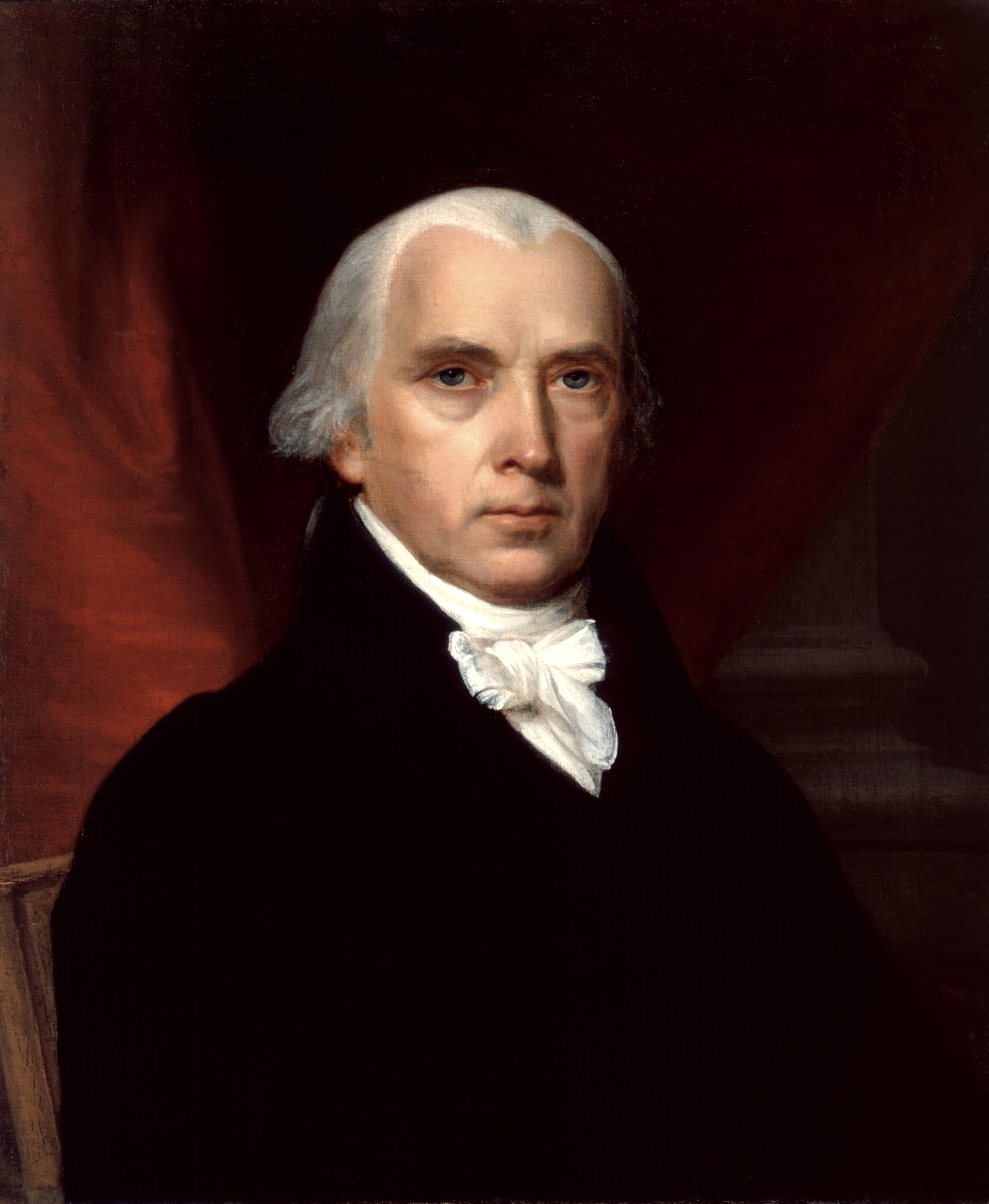
James Madison both defended the absence of a vicinage provision in the Constitution and pushed for more stringent vicinage language in the Sixth Amendment.

James Madison's (A-VA) original draft of the jury provision of the Sixth Amendment provided:

The trial of all crimes (except in cases of impeachment, and cases arising in the land or naval forces, or the militia when on actual service, in time of war or public danger) shall be by an impartial jury of freeholders of the vicinage, with the requisite of unanimity for conviction, of the right of challenge, and other accustomed requisites . . . provided that in cases of crimes committed within any county which may be in possession of an enemy, or in which a general insurrection may prevail, the trial may by law be authorized in some other county of the same state, as near as may be to the seat of the offence.

Madison intended this language to replace Article Three, Section Two, Clause Three, rather than be appended to the Constitution. The Committee of Eleven of the House amended Madison's language as follows:

The trial of all crimes (except in cases of impeachment, and in cases arising in the land or naval forces, or in the militia when on actual service in the time of war, or public danger,) shall be by an impartial jury of freeholders of the vicinage, with the requisite of unanimity for conviction, the right of challenge, and other accustomed requisites . . . . [B]ut if a crime be committed in a place in the possession of an enemy, or in which an insurrection may prevail, the indictment and trial may by law be authorized in some other place within the same State; and if it be committed in a place not within a state, the indictment and trial may be at such place or places as the law may have directed.

Aedanus Burke (A-SC) proposed that "vicinage" be replaced by "district or county in which the offence has been committed". Richard Henry Lee (A-VA) argued that "vicinage" was better, "it being a term well understood by every gentleman of legal knowledge". Rep. Burke's amendment was defeated. As amended by the Committee of Eleven, this language passed the House. The Committee of Three, undertaking the task of transforming the amendments to the body of the Constitution into a separate Bill of Rights, moved the language to Article X and deleted the language concerning crimes not committed within a state.

=== Senate ===
The Senate debated the Bill of Rights from September 2 to September 9 and returned a version to the House on September 10. The Senate deleted every clause from the House version of the Sixth Amendment, with the exception of the grand jury indictment clause. A motion to restore the House wording failed.

Little is known about the Senate debate due to the illness of Senator Samuel Maclay whose journal is a key source for the proceedings of the Senate during the first Congress. A September 14, 1789 letter from Madison to Edmund Pendleton reports:

The Senate have sent back the plan of amendments with some alternations, which strike, in my opinion, at the most salutary articles. In many of the States, juries, even in criminal cases, are taken from the State at large; in others, from districts of considerable extent; in very few from the County alone. Hence a dislike to the restraint with respect to vicinage, which has produced a negative on that clause. . . . Several others have had a similar fate.

=== Conference Committee ===
The altered form in which the Senate returned the Bill of Rights to the House led to a conference committee composed of members of both bodies. The members of the committee from the House proposed that the jury simply be defined as comporting with "the accustomed requisites".

The members of the committee from the Senate were opposed to constitutionalizing the vicinage requirement, believing that the vicinage provisions of the first Judiciary Act (already being debate) were sufficient. A second letter from Madison to Pendleton recounts that the Senators were

inflexible in opposing a definition of the locality of Juries. The vicinage they contend is either too vague or too strict a term; too vague if depending on limits to be fixed by the pleasure of the law, too strict if limited to the county. It was proposed to insert after the word Juries, "with the accustomed requisites", leaving the definition to be construed according to the judgment of professional men. Even this could not be obtained. The truth is that in most of the States the practice is different, and hence the irreconcilable difference of ideas on the subject. In most States, jurors are drawn from the whole body of the community indiscriminately; in others, from large districts comprehending a number of Counties; and in a few only from a single County. The Senate suppose, also, that the provision for vicinage in the Judiciary bill will sufficiently quiet the fears which called for an amendment on this point. (Note: The Judiciary Act of 1789 eventually included a conditional vicinage clause as an exception to a general venue clause. The Act provided: "[T]hat in cases punishable with death, the trial shall be had in the county where the offence was committed, or where that cannot be done without great inconvenience, twelve petit jurors at least shall be summoned from thence.")

The committee adopted the version that passed Congress and was ratified by the states:

In all criminal prosecutions, the accused shall enjoy the right to a . . . trial by an impartial jury of the State and district wherein the crime shall have been committed, which district shall have been previously ascertained by law . . . .

== Interpretation ==
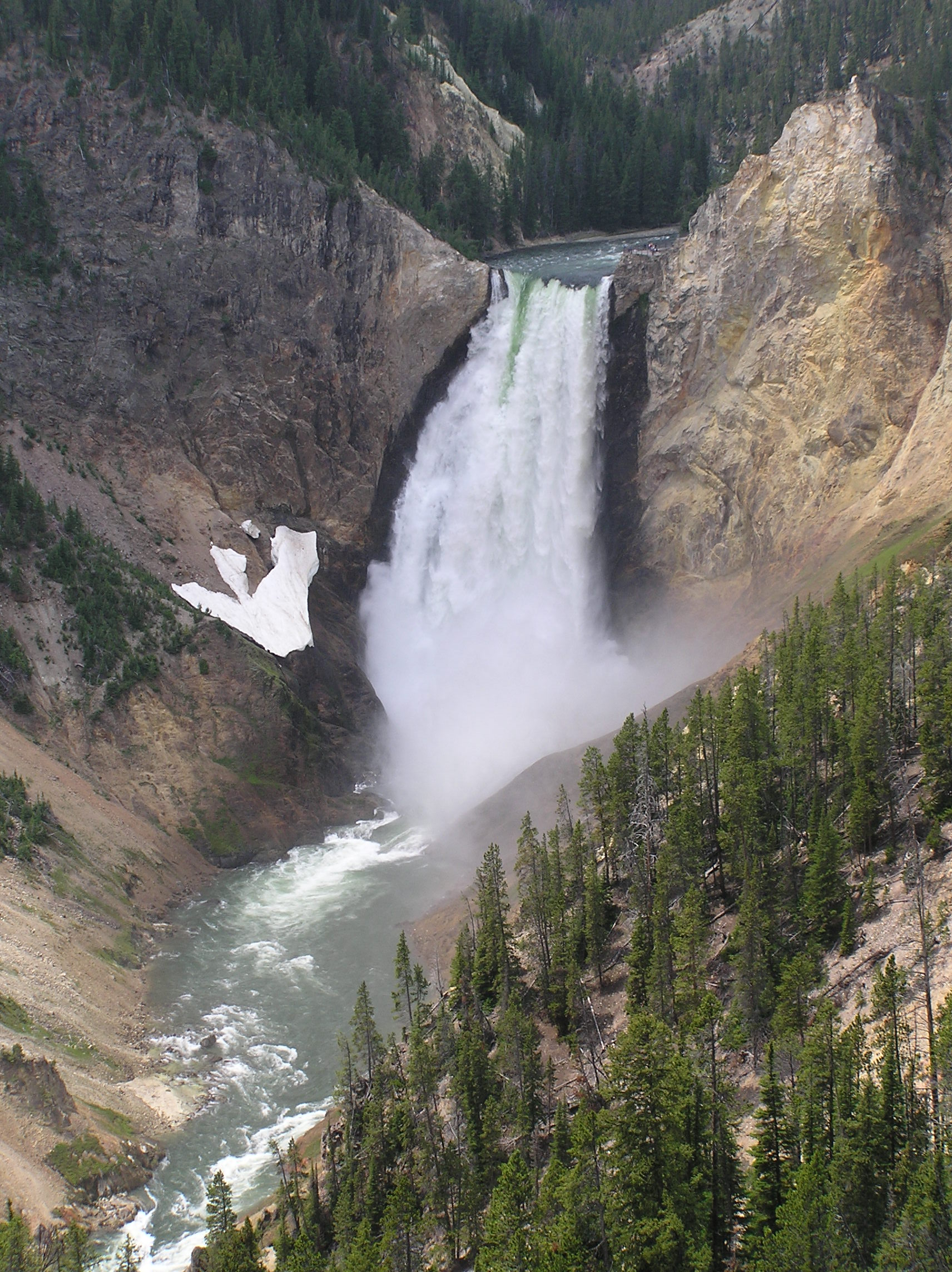
The Vicinage Clause may allow the commission of the "perfect crime" in the Idaho portion of Yellowstone National Park.

=== "Jury..." ===
The Vicinage Clause applies only to petit juries, not grand juries, although some cases finding no violation of the Clause have assumed without deciding that the Clause does apply to grand juries. (Note: Grand juries are required to be selected from either the judicial division or the judicial district wherein the crime was committed under the Jury Selection and Service Act of 1968 (codified as amended at 28 U.S.C. §§ 1861, 1863(a)).)

=== "...of the State and district..." ===
In murder cases arising from the Indian Territory, Navassa Island, and the No Man's Land of the Oklahoma Panhandle, the Supreme Court has held that the Clause places no limits on the prosecution of crimes committed outside the territory of a state.

The Clause does not require a jury drawn from the judicial division (a subset of a federal judicial district) within which the crime occurred; rather, the jury may be drawn from any division of the district. (Note: Nor does the Sixth Amendment's "fair cross-section" requirement require this.) Nor does the Clause prevent the jury from being drawn solely from a judicial division, or any other subset of a judicial district (rather than the entire judicial district). (Note: Until 1966, Federal Rule of Criminal Procedure 16 limited venue to the judicial division wherein the crime was committed. The Jury Selection and Service Act of 1968 gives each district substantial discretion in choosing methods of jury selection, permitting the limiting of the jury pool to the division.)

=== "...wherein the crime shall have been committed,..." ===
The "wherein the crime shall have been committed" language of the clause is in parallel with the venue provision of Article Three—"where the said Crimes shall have been committed."—and with Rule 18 of the Federal Rules of Criminal Procedure—"where the offense was committed". The three provisions have been interpreted in tandem to refer to the locus delicti of the offense.

=== "...which district shall have been previously ascertained by law" ===
Lower courts are split on whether the Clause requires that the defendant be tried in a judicial district that was in existence at the time the crime was committed. Some courts have held that it does. Others have held that it does not and that the district need only be ascertained prior to trial. Even proponents of the former view have found no infirmity when Congress prospectively divides a judicial district but retains the former configuration for past offenses.

=== Incorporation ===
The Third, Fifth, and Sixth Circuits have held that the Vicinage Clause was not incorporated against the states by the Fourteenth Amendment. The Supreme Court has not yet heard an appeal on the matter. A lower federal appeals court in Zicarelli v. Gray (3d Cir. 1976), however, "assumed" that the vicinage right applied at the state level.

=== Zone of death ===
In 2005, Professor Brian C. Kalt of Michigan State University College of Law put forth an argument that the Vicinage Clause, requiring jury selection from the state and district, may permit the commission of the "perfect crime" (technically, more of an "unprosecutable crime") in the portion of Yellowstone National Park within the state of Idaho and that a less perfect crime could be committed in the lightly populated portion of the park contained within the borders of the state of Montana. The entire park has been placed within the jurisdiction of the Court for the District of Wyoming, but the Idaho-state portion of the park has no residents with which to form a jury. Kalt argues that two arguments the government might make in favor of prosecution would be unsuccessful: that the Idaho portion of the park is not part of a state and that the judicial district could be changed after the crime.

However, Kalt argues that the Vicinage Clause might permit a variety of prosecutorial strategies that would at least partially close this loophole. First, the government might be able to charge other crimes that did not occur exclusively within the Idaho portion of the park (for example, if the defendant(s) conspired elsewhere). Second, the government could charge crimes for which the maximum authorized sentence is six months or less, to which the jury right does not attach. Third, the Clause might permit the government to encourage potential jurors to move into the Idaho portion of the park after the crime. Fourth, the government might argue for a purposive, rather than textualist, interpretation of the Clause by arguing that a jury drawn from elsewhere could satisfy the purposes of the Clause. Kalt also notes that the Vicinage Clause would not protect against civil liability or vigilante justice. The defendant could also be charged under state law if it was violation of that as well. Others have noted that the prosecution could simply move for a change of venue due to the impossibility of finding an impartial jury in the location where the crime was committed.

A similar problem was cited by the Nevada Legislature in 1989 when it dissolved Bullfrog County, an uninhabited county (the only uninhabited county in the history of the United States) created in 1987 for the sole purpose of shifting federal transfer payments related to the creation of the Yucca Mountain nuclear waste facility directly to the Nevada state treasury.

== Similar provisions in state constitutions ==
Before the adoption of the federal Constitution, only two state constitutions provided an explicit vicinage right. The Virginia Constitution of 1776 provided: "in all capital or criminal prosecutions a man hath a right to . . . an impartial jury of twelve men of his vicinage." The Pennsylvania Constitution of 1776 read similarly, but said "county" instead of "vicinage"; it was amended in 1790 to say "vicinage".

By contrast, four of the original thirteen state constitutions contained explicit criminal venue provisions. New Hampshire (1784) and Georgia (1777 and 1789) required crimes to be tried in the county where committed. Maryland (1776) and Massachusetts (1780) contained similar provisions.

In Coleman's Appeal (1874), the Supreme Court of Pennsylvania held that "a man shall only be liable to be called on to answer for civil wrongs in the forum of his home, and the tribunal of his vicinage".

== See also ==
- Abouammo v. United States (2026)
- Population Zero, a 2016 feature film with the Vicinage Clause as the central plot device
- For the People season 2 episode 2 "This is America" also dealt with a character named Arthur Covington exploiting the clause in Yellowstone
