= Jury selection in the United States =

Jury selection in the United States is the choosing of members of grand juries and petit juries for the purpose of conducting trial by jury in the United States.

== Voir dire ==
During voir dire, potential jurors are questioned by attorneys and the judge. It has been argued that voir dire is often ineffective at detecting juror bias. Research shows that biographic information in minimal voir dire is not useful for identifying juror bias or predicting verdicts, while attitudinal questions in expanded voir dire can root out bias and predict case outcomes. Extended voir dire in major controlled substance trials may increase accuracy in predicting individual verdicts from 50% to 78%.

== Federal ==
In the federal system, jury selection is governed by the Jury Selection and Service Act and by the Federal Rules of Criminal Procedure in criminal cases, and by the Federal Rules of Civil Procedure in civil cases. In capital cases, each side gets twenty peremptory strikes. In other felony cases, the defendant gets ten peremptory strikes and the government gets six. In misdemeanor cases, each side has three peremptory strikes.

== State ==
Each U.S. state has its own system, which is subject to the requirements of the U.S. Constitution.

The COVID-19 pandemic significantly disrupted jury trials across all states. According to the National Center for State Courts, the number of courts conducting jury trials dropped from 125,222 in 2019 to 33,880 in 2020—a reduction of over 70%. After the mass immunization campaign for the COVID-19 pandemic, the number of jury trials across all states increased to around 48,764, representing less than half the number of trials in 2019.

== Jury selection process ==
A typical jury selection process in the U.S.:

1. The county creates a list of potential jurors from records. Exactly which records are used vary by state, but they may include state tax filers, motor vehicle registrants, voter lists, or even utility lists.
2. The county selects randomly from the list of potential jurors and sends those people a juror summons to appear at a particular court on a particular date.
3. Potential jurors arrive at the courthouse and are placed in a juror pool.
4. When a particular court needs jurors, a set of people from the juror pool are drawn randomly and placed on a panel that is assigned to that court.
5. After instruction from the judge, panelists are chosen at random and placed on the jury.
6. The judge and attorneys ask the jurors questions to look for potential bias or prejudice (for example, knowledge of one of the subjects of the trial). Such jurors will be dismissed and replaced by a new member from the panel. (If necessary, additional panelists may be recruited from the juror pool.)
7. When a complete jury is formed, possibly with alternate jurors, the remaining panelists are dismissed and the trial begins.

== Constitution ==
=== Vicinage Clause ===
Federal criminal petit juries are required to be composed of residents of the state and federal judicial district wherein the crime was committed, which district shall have been previously ascertained by law.

== Faults within the jury selection process ==
=== Bias ===
The juror selection process holds the potential for discrimination in the selection of jurors and the final composition of juries. Claims that errors (of all types) were made during jury selection are among the most common of all grounds for criminal appeals. With regard to legal proceedings within the U.S. military, one argument has been advanced that selection of juries for courts-martial is subject to too much control by commanders, who can pick jurors who will be most likely to convict and hand down heavy penalties.

Batson v. Kentucky, 476 U.S. 79 (1986) banned peremptory challenges based solely on race, although the U.S. Supreme Court has since acted to mitigate its impact. The issue of racial bias in jury selection has been complicated by the question of whose rights are implicated; the potential juror's, or the defendant's. A Michigan Law Review article, published in 1978, asserted that young people, during that period, were under-represented on the nation's jury rolls.

A 2012 study from Duke University published in the Quarterly Journal of Economics investigated the effect of jury selection and racial composition on trial outcomes. The study found that black defendants (81%) are significantly more likely than whites (66%) to be convicted when there are no potential black jurors in the pool. Even with only one black member of the jury pool, conviction rates are almost identical (71% for blacks and 73% for whites). While 64% of cases had at least one black potential juror in the pool, only 28% of all trials had one or more black members on the seated jury. "Whenever attorneys use peremptory challenges to strike black members of the pool ... they forgo the possibility of excluding another potential juror with a similar ex ante probability of convicting," and the composition of the jury indirectly reflects that of the juror pool.

A 2018 study published in the University of Illinois Law Review found that prosecutors and judges tend to remove more African-Americans while defense attorneys remove more whites.

As of 2014, the 9th Circuit Court of Appeals has held that a peremptory challenge based on perceived sexual orientation is unconstitutional.

=== Lack of juror privacy ===
Jurors have very little privacy in the jury selection process. They are always required to disclose some personal information, such as their home addresses and whether they are US citizens, and they are asked for more specific information during voir dire. All information collected, whether through a written questionnaire or through questions answered orally in the courtroom, and regardless of whether the potential juror is eventually selected for the trial, is public, unless the judge issues an order to seal part of the record to protect a particular juror's privacy. The court has legitimate reasons for collecting this information (e.g., to determine whether the potential juror lives within the court's district and is therefore eligible to serve), but the information can be misused. Generally, it is legal for prosecutors, defense attorneys, and news media to use information disclosed to the court by a juror to run a criminal background check on jurors or to otherwise investigate jurors. The American Bar Association said in 2014 that it is ethical for lawyers on either side to check potential jurors' use of social media, but not to contact them through social media sites or to seek information about posts that are not public. These independent investigations usually happen without any notice to the jurors, the court, or other parties in the case, which circumvents judicial oversight of the jury selection process. Additionally, sometimes, this personal information has been used by scammers and harassers to commit crimes. As held by the US Court of Appeals in Chin v. Trustees of Boston University (2019), the jurors' names and home addresses can only be kept confidential after a verdict is announced if the judge makes a particularized finding of privacy concerns, such as a credible threat of violence against the jurors. A general concern about harassment in person or through social media is not enough to protect jurors' privacy.

Potential jurors are as sensitive to privacy concerns in court as they are in their everyday lives, and they do not always disclose sensitive information when asked, especially when they do not understand how that information is relevant to the trial at hand. In the early 19th century, potential jurors could not be asked any "questions tending to the disgrace or the dishonor of the juror" or tending to "infamy, or disgrace"; this tradition of requiring potential jurors to disclose only relevant facts, such as a personal connection to the specific case, continued through the 1970s. Since then, however, some potential jurors have been required to disclose, under oath and to the general public, a wide variety of personal information, including, among other things, their religious and political beliefs; which films or television shows they watch; any bumper stickers on their vehicles; their sexual history and sexual orientation; whether they have been the victim of rape, incest, or other abuse; their medical conditions and which medications they are taking or have taken in the past; whether they have taken illegal drugs; how much money they or their families have; whether they have declared bankruptcy; political contributions they have made; and past criminal convictions. Although these questions invade the potential jurors' privacy beyond what could be asked in court of most accused people and witnesses, potential jurors are generally obligated to answer such questions publicly and truthfully in the hope that this information will help the litigants identify prejudice among jurors. Brandborg v. Lucas (1995) held that jurors can be punished for contempt of court if they do not answer questions the court has determined are "reasonably calculated to discover an actual and likely source of prejudice, rather than pursue a speculative will-o-the-wisp", but not for questions that the court has not determined are potentially relevant to the case at hand.

Although it is technically possible for a potential juror to start legal proceedings about a question asked during voir dire, it is an impractical response, and the main defenses against intrusive questioning are the discretion of the judges, who typically allow any questions the lawyers want to ask, and the fear of the lawyers that a chosen juror may become biased against their side of the case because of their lack of respect for potential jurors during voir dire. Additionally, Sinclair v. United States (1929) held that defendants may not hire private detectives to surveil jurors during a trial.
