= Perfect crime =

Colloquial term

A perfect crime is a crime that is undetected, unattributed to an identifiable perpetrator, or otherwise unsolved or unsolvable. The term is used colloquially in law and fiction (especially crime fiction) for both crimes committed as crimes foremost, and those committed as a kind of technical achievement on the part of the perpetrator.

The term perfect crime connotes one that is (or appears likely to be) unable to be solved, which distinguishes it from one that has merely not yet been solved, or where everyday chance or procedural matters frustrate a conviction.

In certain contexts, such as a poisoning, some argue the bar must be raised to where the mere detection of a crime having been committed renders it imperfect.

== Overview ==
As used by some criminologists and others who study criminal investigations (including mystery writers), a perfect crime goes unsolved not because of incompetence in the investigation, but because of the cleverness and skill of the criminal.

Would-be perfect crimes are a popular subject in crime fiction and movies. They include Perfect Crime (play), Rope, Double Indemnity, Special 26, Strangers on a Train, The Postman Always Rings Twice, Witness for the Prosecution, Dial M for Murder, Don 2 and Aaryan.

== Varying definitions ==
A murder committed by somebody who had never before met the victim, has no criminal record, steals nothing, and tells no one might be a perfect crime. According to criminologists and scientists, this casual definition of perfect crime exists. Another possibility is that a crime might be committed in an area of high public traffic, where DNA from a wide variety of people is present, making the sifting of evidence akin to 'finding a needle in a haystack'.

An intentional killing in which the death is never identified as murder is an example of one of the more rigorous definitions of perfect crime. Other criminologists narrow the range to only those crimes that are not detected at all. By definition, it can never be known if such perfect crimes exist. Many "close calls" have been observed, however—enough to make investigators aware of the possibility of a perfect crime.

=== Unprosecutable crime ===
In 2005, Professor Brian C. Kalt of Michigan State University College of Law put forth an argument that the Vicinage Clause of the United States Constitution – requiring jury selection from the population of the state and court district where the crime is committed – may permit the commission of the "perfect crime" on the technical grounds that a jury trial could not be carried out. Since there are no residents in the portion of Yellowstone National Park that lies within the state of Idaho, and since the entire park has been placed within the jurisdiction of the United States District Court for the District of Wyoming, there are no residents available to form a jury for crimes committed in this specific "Venn diagram" location.

Similar rationale contributed to the dissolution of Bullfrog County, Nevada, in 1989; because the county was unpopulated, and was not assigned to a judicial district, criminal trials could not legally be held there under Nevada state law.

== Real-life examples ==
In March 2009, a $6.8 million jewel theft in Germany was described as being close to a perfect crime, in that despite having DNA evidence (but no other evidence), the police were unable to bring the case to court since the DNA belonged to one of a pair of identical twins, and faced with denials by both, it could not be proven which of the two was the criminal. Other examples of one, or possibly both, identical twins avoiding punishment include juries unable to reach a verdict in a 2004 Boston rape trial, a 2005 Houston rape trial and a 2009 Malaysia drug-smuggling trial. The infamous 1987 Opera House heist in India by a group of men impersonating CBI officers was described as a perfect crime.

== See also ==
- Locked-room mystery
- Leopold and Loeb
- Population Zero, a 2016 feature film with the Vicinage Clause as the central plot device
- Category:Unsolved murders
