= Population Zero =

2016 Canadian found footage thriller film by Adam Levins

- Directed by: Adam Levins
- Written by: Jeff Staranchuk
- Starring: Julian T. Pinder
- Distributed by: A71 Entertainment
- Release dates: April 26, 2016 (Newport Beach); May 5, 2017 (Canada)
- Running time: 84 minutes
- Countries: Canada; United States
- Language: English

Population Zero is a 2016 found footage crime thriller film directed by Adam Levins that premiered at the Newport Beach International Film Festival on April 26, 2016.

The filmmakers were inspired to make the film after learning of the existence of a small portion of Yellowstone National Park that, under the Sixth Amendment's Vicinage Clause, could enable one to commit a crime without having a jury be able to try them, thus creating "the perfect crime". This idea was first written about in a Georgetown Law Journal article, "The Perfect Crime," by Michigan State University law professor Brian C. Kalt, and first dramatized in the 2007 novel "Free Fire" by C. J. Box, from which Population Zero borrows heavily.

== Synopsis ==
The film is a mockumentary examining the history of Dwayne Nelson, a suspected murderer. In 2009, Nelson confessed to shooting three men to death in Yellowstone National Park and despite his confession being accurately detailed, he was not convicted of the crimes because the crime occurred in an uninhabited area and as such, there is no chance of finding a jury to hear the trial. Years later Julian T. Pinder examines the crimes and the legal loophole that allowed Nelson to walk free. As the film progresses Pinder begins to receive strange and frightening items, evidence of Nelson's crime.

== Reception ==
In its opening week in Canada, the film grossed Can$3,841 from 15 theatres.

The Hollywood Reporter said that although the film was uneven in places it was also "creatively eerie". Shock Till You Drop praised the movie, commenting that "Knowing that POPULATION ZERO is a hypothetical scenario played out is immaterial. The question of whether the film is real or not is not the point. The point is that the federal government recognizes that there is a 'Zone of Death' in one of its National Parks, making this film far more unsettling and disturbing than anything to spring from one's imagination."

On Rotten Tomatoes, the film holds an approval rating of 78% based on 9 reviews, with an average rating of 5.90/10.

== See also ==
- Zone of Death (Yellowstone)
- For the People season 2 episode 2 "This Is America" uses a similar concept, but with a character named Arthur Covington murdering his wife in the park
