= Julian T. Pinder =

Canadian filmmaker

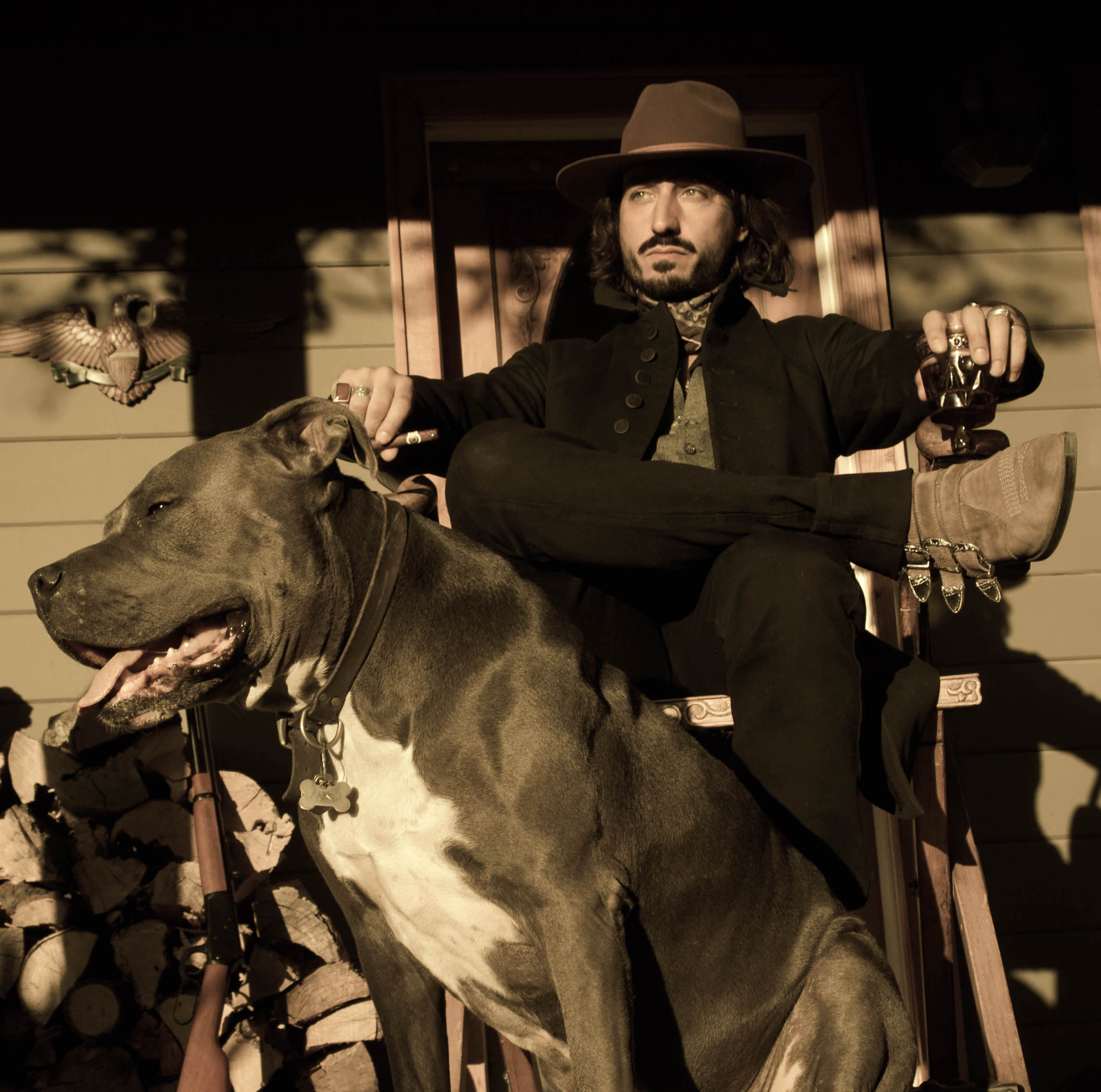
Julian T. Pinder with dog, Pioneertown, California, 2017

Julian T. Pinder is a Canadian-American film director, producer, and writer originally from Dundas, Ontario.

His titles include feature films, documentaries, Netflix Original series, television movies, and commercial campaigns that have been released on all the major streaming platforms and networks including Amazon, Netflix, HBO, Showtime (TV network), KinoSmith, CBC, TVO, Sky Atlantic and more. Throughout his career his films have been showcased at dozens of film festivals globally, and have won or been nominated for Best Picture and other awards at festivals including the Santa Barbara Film Festival, Newport Beach Film Festival, HotDocs, and San Francisco Independent Film Festival, among others.

In 2017 he created, Directed and Executive Produced the Netflix Original 4-part series Fire Chasers with Executive Producer Leonardo DiCaprio. It was nominated for an Emmy and heralded as "Stunning & Gripping" in LA Weekly, "Terrifying" in Indiewire, "Stunning" in The Village Voice, "Searing and intense" in The Hollywood Reporter, "Eloquent...Perversely Beautiful" in The San Francisco Chronicle, and received 100% on Rotten Tomatoes.

His first feature, LAND, which follows the darkly comedic trials of a group of American resort developers in Nicaragua at the time when Sandinista revolutionary Daniel Ortega swept back into power, premiered at the Hot Docs Film Festival in 2010 to four and five star reviews. It was nominated for Best Feature at the Santa Barbara Film Festival, and was labeled by one publication as "a Joseph Conrad story seen through a Hunter S. Thompson haze".

Trouble In The Peace, his second feature documentary, along with a conceptual component video game were featured at the Cannes Film Festival and released in theatres nation-wide in 2012. It shook the oil and gas industry and resulted in a high-profile debate in the Canadian parliament.

Jesus Town USA, also Directed and Produced by Pinder, was commissioned by Sky Atlantic and picked up Showtime and Netflix in 2015. Released initially in the UK, it received 4 stars in The Daily Mail, "pick of the week" in UK's The Sunday Times, "critic's choice" in The Telegraph, and was lauded as a "factual Napoleon Dynamite" in The Globe and Mail.

Population Zero, a scripted feature film both acted in and co-directed by Pinder, played to sold out audiences at the Whistler and Napa Valley film festivals among others, and won the Jury Prize for Best Feature Film at the San Francisco Independent Film Festival as well as being nominated for Best Picture at the Newport Beach Film Festival. It was released on HBO in 2016.

Early in his career during his teens Pinder worked with and was mentored as a producer with the legendary Canadian team Sarrazin Couture Entertainment (La Florida) overseeing numerous projects with Lifetime and CTV, and worked closely with Jennifer Baichwal and Nicholas de Pencier (Watermark, Manufactured Landscapes), and Helen Shaver (The Unit, Law and Order). During this period Pinder also directed a series of short art-house films in wartime Kosovo and Bosnia.

Apart from feature film and television, Pinder has also created commercial campaigns including Ralph Lauren RRL, MTV Rock the Vote spots, and music videos for Grammy-nominated band The Milk Carton Kids starring actress Amanda Seyfried, as well as short films for the iconic band Blondie and The Raconteurs, among many others.

In his earlier years, Pinder opened a restaurant and jazz bar which became a well-known Toronto establishment in the arts scene and hosted, among other events, the Chet Baker Jazz Festival. He also founded one of the first "urban wineries", Vintage One Wines.

Partnering with Paramount Studios and The Autry Museum of The American West in 2022, Pinder founded the Pioneertown Film Festival, a one-off celebration of the Western films shot in and around the legendary movie town built by Roy Rogers. During the weekend-long event The Dandy Warhols and The Sons of The Pioneers played shows, and the Jason Momoa Western The Last Manhunt premiered. The festival also hosts events held by well-known actors, writers, directors, producers, cinematographers, with programmers from film festivals including Cannes and Sundance.

He currently lives with his partner, artist Keely King, between Rutledge, Georgia and their horse ranch outside of Pioneertown, California.

"

== Filmography ==
Year	Film	Director	Producer	Notes
2005	The Stranger I Married	No	Yes	TV movie
2006	Doomstown	No	Yes	TV movie
2010	Land	Yes	Yes	Feature Documentary
2012	Trouble In The Peace	Yes	Yes	Feature Documentary
2014	Rob Ford's Words in the Mouth of a Child	Yes	Yes	Short film
2014	Jesus Town, USA	Yes	Yes	Documentary
2015	The Untitled Western Project	Yes	Yes	TV series
2016	Population Zero	Yes	Yes	Feature Film
2016	40 Days	Yes	Yes	Documentary
2017	Fire Chasers	Yes	Yes	Netflix Original Series
