= Abouammo v. United States =

- Supreme Court of the United States

Argued March 30, 2026 Decided June 11, 2026
- Full case name: Abouammo v. United States
- Docket no.: 25–5146
- Argument: Oral argument

Questions presented
- Whether venue is proper in a district where no offense conduct took place, so long as the statute's intent element "contemplates" effects that could occur there.

Holding
- A person charged with violating §1519 must be tried in the district where the falsification occurred; they cannot be tried in a different district where the investigation was located because no "conduct constituting the offense" happened there.

Court membership
- Chief Justice John Roberts Associate Justices Clarence Thomas · Samuel Alito; Sonia Sotomayor · Elena Kagan; Neil Gorsuch · Brett Kavanaugh; Amy Coney Barrett · Ketanji Brown Jackson

Case opinion
- Majority: Kagan, joined by unanimous

Abouammo v. United States is a United States Supreme Court case regarding whether it is proper for proceedings to be in a court that is not where conduct took place if effects of conduct take place where the court is. The Supreme Court held that it is not the correct venue, striking down the prosecution as unconstitutional.

== Background ==
Article III of the United States Constitution requires that "Trial of all Crimes, except in Cases of Impeachment, shall be by Jury; and such Trial shall be held in the State where the said Crimes shall have been committed; but when not committed within any State, the Trial shall be at such Place or Places as the Congress may by Law have directed." The Sixth Amendment also says "In all criminal prosecutions, the accused shall enjoy the right to a speedy and public trial, by an impartial jury of the State and district wherein the crime shall have been committed, which district shall have been previously ascertained by law...."

Abouammo, who resided in Seattle, allegedly provided information as part of the Saudi infiltration of Twitter and was convicted in the Northern District of California District Court in San Francisco "of acting as a foreign agent without notice to the Attorney General, conspiracy, wire fraud, international money laundering and falsification of records."

Abouammo challenged the venue, which the Ninth Circuit Court of Appeals rejected. The court ruled that because Abouammo sent falsified documents to FBI agents in San Francisco, the venue of San Francisco was proper, saying "venue can be proper in either the district where the wrongful conduct was initiated—where the false record was created—or the district of the expressly contemplated effect—where the investigation it was intended to stymie is ongoing or contemplated."

== Supreme Court ==
The Supreme Court agreed to hear the case on December 5, 2025. The question to be decided was: "Whether venue is proper in a district where no offense conduct took place, so long as the statute's intent element 'contemplates' effects that could occur there." The case was set for oral arguments on March 30, 2026.

On June 11, 2026, the Supreme Court held unanimously that the venue in California was improper, citing the Constitutional protections for a defendant's venue in Article Three of the United States Constitution and the Sixth Amendment to the United States Constitution. Justice Elena Kagan delivered the unanimous opinion of the Court, ruling that "a defendant charged with violating §1519 must be tried in the district where the falsification occurred; he cannot be tried in a different district where the investigation was located because no 'conduct constituting the offense' happened there."

As a result, the Court reversed the Ninth Circuit's ruling and remanded the case for further proceedings consistent with the holding.

== See also ==
- Forum shopping
