= Venue (law) =

Location where a case is heard

In law, the venue is the location where a case is heard.

== United States ==
=== Criminal venue ===
The perceived abuse of English criminal venue law was one of the enumerated grievances in the United States Declaration of Independence, which accused George III of the United Kingdom of "transporting us beyond Seas to be tried for pretended offenses." Article Three of the United States Constitution provides: "Trial of all Crimes . . . shall be held in the State where the said Crimes shall have been committed; but when not committed within any State, the Trial shall be at such Place or Places as the Congress may by Law have directed."

The "where the said Crimes shall have been committed" language refers to the locus delicti, and a single crime may often give rise to several constitutionally permissible venues. "[T]he locus delicti must be determined from the nature of the crime alleged and the location of the act or acts constituting it." Thus, venue may be constitutionally permissible even if an individual defendant was never personally present in the relevant state. For example, conspiracy may be prosecuted wherever the agreement occurred or wherever any overt act was committed.

For the purposes of constitutional venue, the boundaries of the states are questions of law to be determined by the judge, but the location of the crime is a question of fact to be determined by the jury.

The venue provision of Article III (regulating the location of the trial) is distinct from the Vicinage Clause of the Sixth Amendment (regulating the geography from which the jury pool is selected). The unit of the former is the state; the unit of the latter is the state and judicial district. Unlike judicial districts under the Vicinage Clause, consistent with Article III, Congress may "provide a place of trial where none was provided when the offense was committed, or change the place of trial after the commission of the offense."

In Abouammo v. United States (2026), the Supreme Court of the United States held that the proper venue is usually where the crime was committed, and is constitutionally protected by Article III and the Sixth Amendment.

=== Civil venue ===
Venue is either a county (for cases in state court) or a district or division (for cases in federal court). Venue deals with locality of a lawsuit—that is, in which locale a lawsuit may be filed or commenced. It involves a decision of which district (federal court) or county (state court) is appropriate, based typically on where a matter occurred or where the defendant resides. A case can be brought only in a certain venue. For instance, in federal diversity cases, the venue can be only (1) the district where any defendant resides if all defendants reside in the same state (although corporations reside in any district that may exercise personal jurisdiction over them, according to 28 U.S.C. § 1391(b), (2) the district where a substantial part of the events giving rise to the claim occurred, or (3) the district in which any defendant is subject to personal jurisdiction if there is no district in which the claim can otherwise be brought (28 U.S.C. § 1391).

Venue under American law is a concept distinct from jurisdiction, which focuses on the authority of a court to hear a particular case. Venue is concerned with the geographical location of the court where a lawsuit is commenced. However, unlike personal jurisdiction, there is no constitutional requirement for proper venue in order to have a valid judgment.

The general venue statute for United States federal courts is 28 U.S.C. § 1391 with special rules listed in §§ 1392-1413. Venue can be transferred from one federal district to another (28 U.S.C. § 1404). A case can also be removed from a state court to a federal court. Finally, a case may be dismissed because its venue is harshly "unfair" to one or more parties under a doctrine called forum non conveniens, often used in cases where the events took place in a foreign country.

Defendants can waive venue at the time of trial (Neirbo Co. v. Bethlehem Shipbuilding Corp., 308 U.S. 165 (1939)). Plaintiffs can waive venue at the time of trial. Plaintiffs may also waive their right to sue in certain venues through a contract that contains a valid and reasonable forum selection clause or venue selection clause. Forum selection clauses, establishing venue convenient to the offeror, are near universal in form contracts offered by a party that does business in many places.

The proper recourse for challenging venue is a motion to dismiss for improper venue. Fed. R. Civ. P 12(b)(3). This is one of the waivable defenses, meaning that this must be made in the initial response to the complaint or it will be waived.

== See also ==
- Court
- Jurisdiction
