= Juries in the United States =

Jury system in the United States

A citizen's right to a trial by jury is a central feature of the United States Constitution. It is considered a fundamental principle of the American legal system.

Laws and regulations governing jury selection and conviction/acquittal requirements vary from state to state (and are not available in courts of American Samoa), but the fundamental right itself is mentioned five times in the Constitution: Once in the original text (Article III, Section 2) and four times in the Bill of Rights (in the Fifth, the Sixth, and the Seventh Amendments).

The American system utilizes three types of juries: Investigative grand juries, charged with determining whether enough evidence exists to warrant a criminal indictment; petit juries (also known as a trial jury), which listen to the evidence presented during the course of a criminal trial and are charged with determining the guilt or innocence of the accused party; and civil juries, which are charged with evaluating civil lawsuits.

The power of the jury has declined substantially since the founding relative to other branches of government thanks to practices like judicial acquittal, summary judgment, judges deciding money damages, grand juries not being required in all states, and plea-bargaining. Suja A. Thomas argues the shifting of any power to judges and other branches by the Supreme Court is unconstitutional and undesirable. Robert Burns agrees, arguing that elites gain power when judges, not juries, decide cases.

== History ==
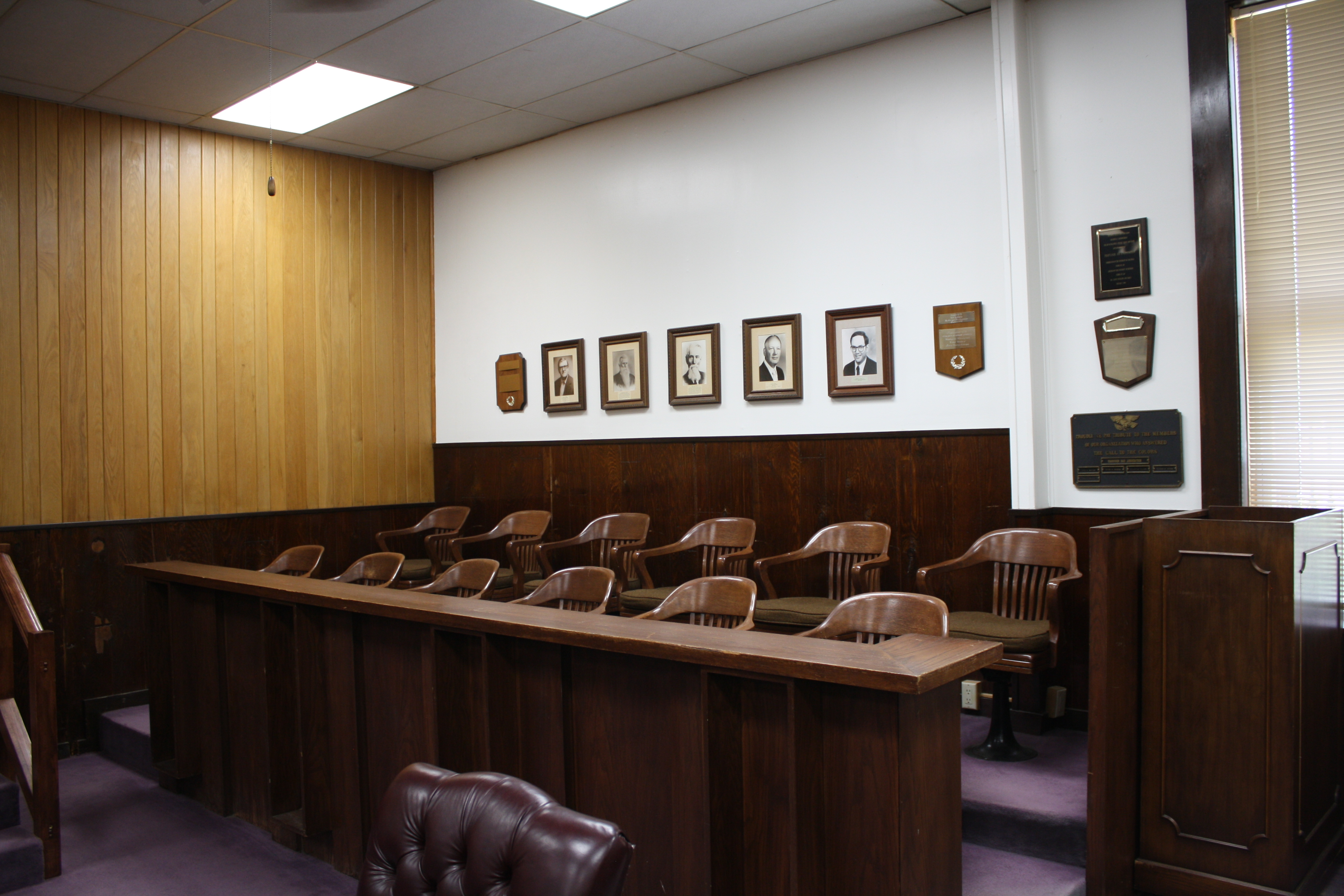
Jury box in the courtroom at the Boone County Courthouse (Arkansas)

In some American colonies (such as in New England and Virginia) and less often in England, juries also handed down rulings on the law in addition to rulings on the facts of the case. The American grand jury was also indispensable to the American Revolution by challenging the Crown and Parliament, including by indicting British soldiers, refusing to indict people who criticized the crown, proposing boycotts and called for the support of the war after the Declaration of Independence. In the late 18th century, colonial civil, criminal and grand juries played significant roles in checking the power of the executive, the legislature and the judiciary.

The U.S. Declaration of Independence accused George III of "depriving us in many cases, of the benefits of trial by jury."

Article III of the U.S. Constitution states that all trials shall be by jury. The right was expanded with the Sixth Amendment to the United States Constitution, which states in part, "In all criminal prosecutions, the accused shall enjoy the right to a speedy and public trial, by an impartial jury of the state and district wherein the crime shall have been committed," and the Seventh Amendment to the United States Constitution, which guarantees a jury trial in civil cases.

The U.S. Supreme Court noted the importance of the jury right in its 1968 ruling of Duncan v. Louisiana:

Those who wrote our constitutions knew from history and experience that it was necessary to protect against unfounded criminal charges brought to eliminate enemies and against judges too responsive to the voice of higher authority. The framers of the constitutions strove to create an independent judiciary but insisted upon further protection against arbitrary action. Providing an accused with the right to be tried by a jury of his peers gave him an inestimable safeguard against the corrupt or overzealous prosecutor and against the compliant, biased, or eccentric judge.

=== Women in United States juries ===
The representation of women in United States juries has increased during the last hundred years due to legislation and court rulings. Until the late twentieth century, women were routinely excluded or allowed to opt out of jury service. The push for women's jury rights generated debate similar to the women's suffrage movement, permeating the media with arguments for and against it. Federal and state court case rulings increased women's participation on juries. Some states allowed women to serve on juries much earlier than others. States also differed on whether women's suffrage implied women's jury service. Robert Burns argues that the decline of the jury trial has been and would be a setback for hard-earned enfranchisement of women and minorities.

== Federal jury ==
A federal jury, in the United States, is impaneled to try federal civil cases and to indict and try those accused by United States Attorneys of federal crimes. A federal grand jury consists of 16 to 23 members and requires the concurrence of 12 in order to indict. A federal petit jury consists of 12 members in criminal cases and 6 to 12 members in civil cases, and the verdict must be unanimous.

== Federal jury trial rights ==
=== Criminal juries ===
==== Grand jury ====
A grand jury decides whether or not there is enough evidence ("probable cause") that a person has committed a crime in order to put him or her on trial. If a grand jury decides there is enough evidence, the person is indicted. A grand jury has 16-23 members, and its proceedings are not open to the public. Unlike a petit jury, defendants and their attorneys do not have the right to appear before the grand jury.

==== Petit jury ====
A petit jury, also known as a trial jury, is the standard type of jury used in criminal cases in the United States. Petit juries are responsible for deciding whether or not a defendant is guilty of violating the law in a specific case. They consist of 12 people, and their deliberations are private. Their decision is known as a verdict and decides whether a person is guilty or not guilty.

==== Scope of constitutional right ====
Currently in the United States every person accused of a crime punishable by incarceration for more than six months has a constitutional right to a trial by jury, which arises from the Sixth Amendment and Article Three of the United States Constitution. The Supreme Court incorporated this right against the states in Duncan v. Louisiana in 1968. Most states' constitutions also grant the right of trial by jury in lesser criminal matters, though most have eliminated that right in offenses punishable by fine only. The Supreme Court has ruled that if imprisonment is for six months or less, trial by jury is not required, meaning a state may choose whether or not to permit trial by jury in such cases.

Specifically, the Supreme Court has held that no offense can be deemed 'petty' for purposes of the right to trial by jury where imprisonment for more than six months is authorized. Justice Black and Justice Douglas concurred, stating that they would have required a jury trial in all criminal proceedings in which the sanction imposed bears the indicia of criminal punishment. Chief Justice Burger, Justice Harlan and Justice Stewart objected to setting this limitation at six months for the States, preferring to give them greater leeway. No jury trial was required when the trial judge suspended sentence and placed defendant on probation for three years. There is a presumption that offenses carrying maximum imprisonment of six months or less are petty, although it is possible that such long an offense could be pushed into the serious category if the legislature tacks on onerous penalties not involving incarceration. No jury trial is required, however, when the maximum sentence is six months in jail, a fine not to exceed $1,000, a 90-day driver's license suspension, and attendance at an alcohol use disorder education course. The Supreme Court found that the disadvantages of such a sentence, "onerous though they may be, may be outweighed by the benefits that result from speedy and inexpensive nonjury adjudications." Such interpretations have been criticized on the grounds that "all" is not a word that constitution-makers use lightly.

In the case of traffic offenses punishable by fine only (including parking tickets), and misdemeanor charges providing for imprisonment of six months or less, the availability of trial by jury varies from state to state, usually providing only for bench trials. The three exceptions are Texas, Vermont, and Virginia, which provide the defendant with the right to a jury trial in all cases, which means if one is willing to pay the cost in case of a loss, one may even obtain a jury trial for a parking ticket in those states. In Virginia, one wanting a jury trial on a minor misdemeanor or traffic offense would actually have a right to two trials if they wanted a jury trial on the issue, first by bench trial only in District court, and then, if they lost, to a trial de novo in Circuit court, this time with a jury if they chose to do so. Similarly, in Texas, fine-only misdemeanor offenses tried first in a court not of record (Justice of the Peace courts or municipal courts without a court reporter) may be appealed to a trial de novo in county court.

Many juvenile court systems do not recognize a right to a jury trial, on the grounds that juvenile proceedings are civil rather than criminal, and that jury trials would cause the process to become adversarial.

==== Sentencing enhancements ====
In the cases Apprendi v. New Jersey, and Blakely v. Washington, the Supreme Court of the United States held that a criminal defendant has a right to a jury trial not only on the question of guilt or innocence, but any fact used to increase the defendant's sentence beyond the maximum otherwise allowed by statutes or sentencing guidelines. This invalidated the procedure in many states and the federal courts that allowed sentencing enhancement based on "a preponderance of evidence", where enhancement could be based on the judge's findings alone.

==== Unanimity ====
Unanimous jury verdicts are required to convict in serious criminal cases. A jury must be unanimous for either a guilty or not guilty decision. In the event of a hung jury, charges against the defendant are not dropped as a matter of right (and can be brought again without triggering double jeopardy protections). In April 2020, in Ramos v. Louisiana the Supreme Court incorporated the unanimity requirement against the states, overturning Apodaca v. Oregon. Previously, Oregon had allowed non-unanimous decisions, and Louisiana had only recently abolished them for crimes committed after 2018.

==== Waiver ====
The vast majority of U.S. criminal cases are not concluded with a jury verdict, but rather by plea bargain. Both prosecutors and defendants often have a strong interest in resolving the criminal case by negotiation resulting in a plea bargain. If the defendant waives a jury trial, a bench trial is held. Research indicates there is not a consistent difference between penalties handed down in jury trials and those handed down in bench trials.

In United States Federal courts, there is no absolute right to waive a jury trial. Per Federal Rule of Criminal Procedure 23(a), only if the prosecution and the court consent may a defendant have a waiver of jury trial. However, most states give the defendant the absolute right to waive a jury trial. In those states, the right to a jury trial belongs exclusively to the criminal defendant, and the prosecution cannot obtain a jury trial if the defendant has validly waived their right to one. In Patton v. United States, one of the jurors became incapacitated and counsel for the defendant and the government agreed to continue with 11 jurors. The U.S. Supreme Court ruled that this was acceptable if the prosecution and the court, as well as the defendant, agreed to this procedure.

=== Civil juries ===
==== Seventh Amendment ====
The right to trial by jury in a civil case is addressed by the 7th Amendment, which provides: "In Suits at common law, where the value in controversy shall exceed twenty dollars, the right of trial by jury shall be preserved, and no fact tried by a jury shall be otherwise re-examined in any Court of the United States, than according to the rules of the common law." Although the civil jury (unlike the criminal jury) has fallen into disuse in much of the rest of the world, including England, it remains in high esteem in the United States. In Joseph Story's 1833 treatise Commentaries on the Constitution of the United States, he wrote, "[I]t is a most important and valuable amendment; and places upon the high ground of constitutional right the inestimable privilege of a trial by jury in civil cases, a privilege scarcely inferior to that in criminal cases, which is conceded by all to be essential to political and civil liberty." Nearly every state constitution contains a similar guarantee.

The 7th Amendment does not create any right to a jury trial; rather, it "preserves" the right to jury trial that existed in 1791 at common law. In this context, common law means the legal environment the United States inherited from England at the time. In England in 1791, civil actions were divided into actions at law and actions in equity. Actions at law had a right to a jury, actions in equity did not.

The decision in Rachal v. Hill, indicated that 7th Amendment right to jury trial may severely limit developments in the principles of res judicata. Some critics believe that the United States has more trial by jury than is necessary or desirable.

The right to a jury trial is determined based upon the a demand in the complaint brought by a Plaintiff, without regard to the defenses or counterclaims asserted by a defendant.

The right to a jury trial in civil cases does not extend to the states, except when a state court is enforcing a federally created right, of which the right to trial by jury is a substantial part.

It has been suggested that in complex litigation, the jury's inability to comprehend the issues may cause the 7th Amendment right to conflict with due process rights and authorize the judge to strike the jury.

The right to trial by jury in bankruptcy cases has been described as unclear.

In Colgrove v. Battin, the Supreme Court held that a civil jury of six members did not violate the Seventh Amendment right to trial by jury in a civil case.

==== Federal Rules of Civil Procedure ====
Federal Rules of Civil Procedure Rule 2 says "[t]here is one form of action - the civil action[,]" which abolishes the legal/equity distinction. Today, in actions that would have been "at law" in 1791, there is a right to a jury; in actions that would have been "in equity" in 1791, there is no right to a jury. However, Federal Rule of Civil Procedure 39(c) allows a court to use one at its discretion. To determine whether the action would have been legal or equitable in 1791, one must first look at the type of action and whether such an action was considered "legal" or "equitable" in 1791. Next, the relief being sought must be examined. Monetary damages alone were purely a legal remedy, and thus entitled to a jury. Non-monetary remedies such as injunctions, rescission, and specific performance were all equitable remedies, and thus up to the judge's discretion, not a jury. In Beacon Theaters v. Westover, the U.S. Supreme Court discussed the right to a jury, holding that when both equitable and legal claims are brought, the right to a jury trial still exists for the legal claim, which would be decided by a jury before the judge ruled on the equitable claim.

Following the English tradition, U.S. juries have usually been composed of 12 jurors, and the jury's verdict has usually been required to be unanimous. However, in many jurisdictions, the number of jurors is often reduced to a lesser number (such as five or six) by legislative enactment, or by agreement of both sides. Some jurisdictions also permit a verdict to be returned despite the dissent of one, two, or three jurors. Federal Rule of Civil Procedure 48 states that a federal civil jury must begin with at least 6 and no more than 12 members, and that the verdict must be unanimous unless the parties stipulate otherwise.

==== Waiver ====
Alternative dispute resolution is becoming increasingly common. Mandatory binding arbitration has been used by some parties to prevent the 7th Amendment right to a civil jury trial from being invoked. Arbitration agreements are becoming increasingly common in the marketplace, to the point at which it is becoming difficult for consumers to purchase products without waiving their right to settle disputes arising out of the transaction by jury trial. It has been argued that arbitration clauses should be held to a higher "knowing-consent" standard in order to be upheld.

== Jury selection ==
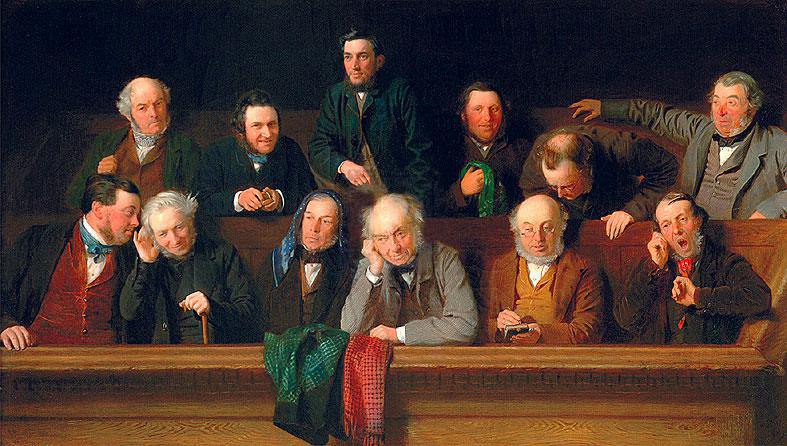
A nineteenth-century painting of a jury

Jurors in some states are selected through voter registration and drivers' license lists. A form is sent to prospective jurors to pre-qualify them by asking the recipient to answer questions about citizenship, disabilities, ability to understand the English language, and whether they have any conditions that would excuse them from being a juror. If they are deemed qualified, a summons is issued. In the federal system, jurors are selected in accordance with the Jury Selection Act.

== Jury-imposed sentences ==
Jury sentencing is the practice of having juries decide what penalties to give those who have been convicted of criminal offenses. The practice of jury sentencing began in Virginia in the 18th century and spread westward to other states that were influenced by Virginia-trained lawyers. As of 2018, Arkansas, Kentucky, Missouri, Oklahoma, Texas, and Virginia have sentencing by jury. Alabama, Georgia, Indiana, Illinois, Mississippi, Montana, Tennessee, and West Virginia had jury sentencing in times past, but then abandoned it.

=== Rise of jury sentencing ===
The impetus for introducing jury sentencing was that in the late 18th century, punishment options expanded beyond shaming sanctions and the mandatory death penalty and came to include various ranges and modes of imprisonment, creating more room for case-by-case decisionmaking to which juries were thought to be well-suited.

Virginia was the first state to adopt jury sentencing. The state's first constitution was enacted in 1776, and shortly thereafter, in 1779, Thomas Jefferson proposed to the Virginia General Assembly a revised criminal code that would have eliminated pardons and benefit of clergy, abolished capital punishment for most offenses, and allowed juries to decide punishments when the penalty was discretionary. This bill failed, however, both in 1779 and 1786, after James Madison had reintroduced it while Jefferson was in France.

Sentencing by jury was, however, successfully enacted in Virginia's 1796 penal code, which like the 1779 bill replaced capital punishment with terms of imprisonment for most felony offenses. Kentucky adopted a penal reform bill introduced by John Breckenridge that implemented sentencing by jury in 1798. While in Virginia, magistrates continued to have misdemeanor sentencing power (possibly because of the political influence of magistrates who served in the General Assembly), in Kentucky, this power was given to juries. Kentucky juries tried and sentenced slaves and free blacks, and even decided cases involving prison discipline, imposing punishments such as flagellation or solitary confinement for infractions. Georgia and Tennessee adopted sentencing by jury in 1816 and 1829, respectively.

In contrast, northern states such as Pennsylvania, Maryland, New Jersey, and New York allowed judges to determine penalties, with Pennsylvania also allowing judges to pardon prisoners who, in their view, had evidenced sincere reformation. One hypothesis is that Virginia opted for jury sentencing because Federalists like George Keith Taylor distrusted the Republican district court judges; while in Pennsylvania, the Constitutionalists sought (over the objections of Republicans) to put sentencing power in the hands of the judges because the bench was populated by Constitutionalists. North Carolina, South Carolina, and Florida, which did not establish penitentiaries until after the American Civil War, also left sentencing to judges' discretion.

The adoption of jury sentencing happened at the same time that the movement for an elective judiciary gathered speed, with at least four states, Alabama, Mississippi, Montana, and North Dakota switching to judicial elections around the same time that they adopted jury sentencing. Both reforms may have been due to a mistrust of unelected judges.

During the ten years of the Republic of Texas, judges determined sentences. The change to jury determination of the penalty was brought about by one of the first laws passed by the first legislature of the State of Texas in 1846, which empowered the jury to sentence the defendant in all criminal cases except capital cases and cases for which punishment was fixed by law.

Indiana, Illinois, Arkansas, Oklahoma, and West Virginia adopted jury sentencing later in the 19th century.

=== Decline of jury sentencing ===
The 1895 U.S. Supreme Court ruling in Sparf v. United States reflected growing concern that letting juries decide whether or how the law should be applied in particular cases could be detrimental to the rule of law. By 1910, the role of juries in determining penalties was being eroded by the professionalization of sentencing, as many states passed laws that created parole and probation systems.

These systems were based on a consequentialist philosophy that it would be more useful for society to focus on finding ways to prevent future crime than on fixing blame for crime that had occurred in the past. Criminal behavior was viewed as the result of such factors as heredity, social circumstances, random breeding, and Darwinian struggle, rather than an abuse of divinely-granted free will. Psychology and sociology would determine the causes of crime and what social reforms and treatment programs would correct them.

Probation officers gathered and analyzed information about the defendant's character and prepared a presentence report that served as the basis for the ultimate sentence. Probation provided opportunities for treatment in the community for juveniles and adults. In the prison system, parole commissioners, trained in penology and insulated from political pressures, determined when prisoners had been rehabilitated and could be reintegrated into society.

The process of preparing a presentence report, which takes weeks, only begins after the defendant is convicted, since if they were to be acquitted, the effort that went into preparing the report would be wasted. It would, therefore, not be possible for juries to sentence the defendant at the time of conviction, if the jury needed to rely on a presentence report in making its sentencing decision; rather, the jury would need to be broken up and reassembled later, which could be unworkable if the delay between verdict and sentencing is substantial.

Furthermore, jury control procedures typically provide that during the trial, information about the defendant's background that is not relevant to the issue of guilt is not to be presented in the presence of the jury, lest it prejudice them. The assumptions that presentence reports would be more informative than presentence hearings, and that training and experience were required to intelligently consider the data and assess sanctions, militated in favor of having a judge rather than a jury do the sentencing. In the case of McKeiver v Pennsylvania, the U.S. Supreme Court held that alleged juvenile delinquents have no right to a jury trial, with Harry Blackmun and three other Justices opining that an adversarial system would put an end to the prospect of an intimate, informal protective proceeding focused on rehabilitation.

Georgia and Tennessee both had periods (from 1937 to 1939 and from 1913 to 1923, respectively) in which they briefly abandoned jury sentencing while experimenting with indeterminate sentencing. By 1919, fourteen states gave juries sentencing powers in non-capital cases, although by 1960, that number had dropped to thirteen.

By the 1970s and 1980s, determinate sentencing, a new intellectual current that repudiated the rehabilitative model with its focus on using mathematical models and grids to determine sentences, had made inroads, making jury sentencing seem like more of an anachronism. Georgia permanently abandoned jury sentencing in 1974 and Tennessee did the same in 1982. By the 1980s, Alabama, Illinois, Indiana, Montana, and North Dakota had also abandoned jury sentencing, and Mississippi was using jury sentencing only in rape and statutory rape cases. Oklahoma abolished jury sentencing but reinstated it in 1999.

==== Possible revival of jury sentencing ====
According to some commentators, the time is ripe for a revival of jury sentencing, because flaws in the determinate sentencing systems are becoming increasingly apparent. Lawmakers drafting legislation such as the Sentencing Reform Act have had difficulty mustering the political will to make clear choices among opposing moral and ideological viewpoints, instead delegating these decisions to agencies that lack the representativeness and democratic origin of legislatures. Prosecutors have routinely circumvented the sentencing guidelines through their charging and plea bargaining decisions, creating a new set of disparities, despite the intent of the guidelines to curtail disparities. Determinate sentencing has also failed to reduce racial disparity in sentencing.

Also, some juries have been acquitting guilty defendants to save them from what they regard as overly harsh mandatory minimum sentences, such as those imposed by the Rockefeller Drug Laws and California's three-strikes law. There have been movements to abolish sentencing commissions and guideline systems and inform jurors of their right to nullify. Decisions like Apprendi v. New Jersey (requiring a jury, rather than a judge, to find any facts that would increase a defendant's maximum sentence) and Ring v. Arizona (requiring a jury, rather than a judge, to find whether there are aggravating factors justifying capital punishment) have also signaled a willingness by the judiciary to expand the role of the jury in the legal process.

Jury sentencing has been seen as a way to in many cases render moot the questions raised by Apprendi and related cases such as Blakely v. Washington and United States v. Booker about the differences between elements of an offense and sentencing factors by letting the jury decide all the facts. Cases such as Miller v. Alabama and Graham v. Florida (banning mandatory life imprisonment without parole, and life imprisonment without parole in non-homicide cases, respectively, for juveniles, as contrary to the Eighth Amendment to the United States Constitution's prohibition of cruel and unusual punishment) also raise a question of whether the Supreme Court logically should allow only a jury, rather than a judge, to determine a juvenile should receive such a sentence, given the parallels between adult capital punishment case law and juvenile life imprisonment with parole case law.

=== Plea bargains, judicial override, and juror access to information ===
In Virginia, under the 1796 act, capital punishment remained mandatory for first-degree murder, but the penalty for second-degree murder was any term between five and eighteen years in the penitentiary. The 1796 act gave the court in murder cases the authority to "determine the degree of the crime, and to give sentence accordingly" when a defendant was "convicted by confession." The judge's discretion to set sentences in cases of confession did not exist in Kentucky.

In Missouri, informing juries of sentences of defendants in similar cases or the sentences of co-participants in the crime on trial is strictly prohibited under the rules of evidence." Similarly, the Kentucky truth in sentencing statute, which generally increases the information available to sentencing juries, does not provide for sentencing guidelines and statistics. Kentucky courts have also held parole eligibility statistics inadmissible. The military at one time provided jurors with sentencing statistics and guidelines was the military, but this practice ended in the late 1950s as the military's judicial philosophy shifted its emphasis away from sentencing uniformity and towards individualized judgments. The United States Court of Military Appeals held that jurors were not to consider sentences in similar cases or to consult the sentencing manual.

Under Virginia's current system, jurors are controversially not allowed access to the Commonwealth's sentencing guidelines or to information about whether sentences will run consecutively or concurrently, and until 2000 were also not informed that parole had been abolished in Virginia. A judge must justify any departure from the jury's recommendation in writing to the Virginia Criminal Sentencing Commission. Less than one-quarter of jury-recommended sentences are modified by judges. Due to concerns about juries' imposing higher sentences than what the sentencing guidelines would suggest, many defendants opt either for bench trials or plea bargains.

States with jury sentencing have often allowed judges to intervene in the sentencing process, e.g. by reducing the sentence imposed by the jury, imposing hard labor or solitary confinement in addition to the jury's assessment of fines, or determining the place of confinement imposed by the jury. In Alabama, judges were allowed to override juries' recommendations of life imprisonment and impose capital punishment instead, until a 2017 law took that power away. All jury sentencing states except Texas allow the judge to fix the punishment in case the jury fails to agree on a sentence, making it impossible for there to be a mistrial due to a hung jury at sentencing.

In 2020, the Virginia Senate approved SB 810, giving juries applicable discretionary sentencing guidelines worksheets, and SB 811, providing that the court ascertain the punishment unless the defendant requests jury sentencing. Proponent Joe Morrissey said, "Juries are unpredictable . . . You have much more stability with the judge doing the sentencing."

=== Arguments for and against jury sentencing ===
An argument based on the Sixth and Seventh Amendments to the United States Constitution is that criminal and civil juries have similar societal functions, including checking the abuse of governmental power, injecting community values into legal decisions, and aiding public acceptance of legal determinations; and therefore the criminal system should have juries decide sentences much as the civil system has juries decide judgments. A counter-argument is that studies show, at least in second-degree murder cases where juries are allowed to recommend mercy, that more punitive sentences increase perceptions of legitimacy, and that judges' declining to follow juries' recommendations does not decrease public confidence and perceptions of fairness and legitimacy.

Arguments that have been raised against sentencing by jury are that juries are not as accountable as judges; that putting them in charge of determining both guilt and the sentence concentrates too much power in one body; and that different juries may differ widely in the sentences they impose. Counterarguments are that the lack of accountability of jurors to a higher authority preserves their judicial independence, and that judges are also capable of differing from other judges in the sentences they impose. Judges may even deviate from their own usual sentencing practices if the case is high-profile or a judicial election is coming up. Also, disparities are not always a sign of arbitrariness; sometimes they may reflect geographical differences in public attitudes toward a given crime, or a jury's taking proper account of the individual circumstances of each offender.

It is sometimes argued that an unreasonable juror may force the rest of the jury into an undesirable compromise to find the defendant guilty but impose an overly light sentence. A counter-argument is that whether this is bad or good is a matter of perception since "one juror's principled holdout is another juror's irrational nullification. One jury's 'compromise' is another jury's perfectly appropriate give-and-take deliberations."

According to University of Chicago Law School lecturer Jenia Iontcheva, sentencing decisions are well-suited to being made through a process of deliberative democracy rather than by experts such as judges, since they involve deeply contested moral and political issues rather than scientific or technical issues. She argues that since sentencing requires individualized, case-by-case assessments, sentences should be decided through small-scale deliberation by juries, as opposed to having lawmakers codify general policies for mechanical application by judges.

An advantage Iontcheva cites of having juries come together to deliberate on sentences is that the jurors may alter their preferences in the light of new perspectives. She argues that the hearing and consideration of diverse opinions will give the sentencing decisions greater legitimacy, and that engaging ordinary citizens in government through this process of deliberative democracy will give these citizens confidence about their ability to influence political decisions and thus increase their willingness to participate in politics even after the end of their jury service. Racial and other minorities may also benefit from having greater representation among jurors than among judges.

In jurisdictions that do not have any statutory provisions formally allowing jury sentencing, judges have sometimes consulted with the jury on sentencing anyway. At the federal level, the practice of polling the jury and using their input in sentencing was upheld on appeal by the 6th U.S. Circuit Court of Appeals.

== Reception ==
In 1974, Edward Devitt proposed abolishing the federal civil jury system in order to clean up the backlog of cases, keep court calendars current, and obtain better and more efficient administration of justice. Research from 1995 indicates that while civil trials may proceed more slowly before a jury, judge-tried cases last longer on the docket. However, proposals to abolish the jury system have been criticized on the grounds that only reform, not abolition, is necessary; and that there is no better alternative system.

"We are better governed because we govern ourselves in part through trial."

— Robert Burns, Death of the American Jury, p. 118

Founding fathers including Thomas Jefferson, John Adams, and Alexander Hamilton thought the jury was essential as a check against judges. James Wilson acknowledged the jury is not perfect, but argued its mistakes were easily corrected and it could never grow into a dangerous system. Scholars Akhil Amar, Nancy Marder, Roger Fairfax, Rachel Barkow, Randy Jonakait, and Renee Lettow Lerner see the jury as an important constitutional entity that checks the other branches of government. Suja A. Thomas argues that juries were intended by the founders as a co-equal check on the other branches of government such as the executive branch (prosecutors), the judicial branch (judges), the legislature and states, but that these other branches of government had taken almost all of the jury's power by the 21st century, even as juries became used more widely around the world. She further argues that juries are more impartial than judges and other decision-makers because they are free from political or status incentives to rule a certain way. Robert Burns further argues that the public nature of jury trials can start important political conversations by surfacing and making public information that otherwise would stay hidden. He cites cases around asbestos, tobacco, and lead as examples. He argues that companies and the chamber of commerce have worked to take away jury power, especially after the 1998 Tobacco Master Settlement Agreement.

== See also ==
- Democratic backsliding in the United States
