= Zone of Death (Yellowstone) =

Area in Idaho section of Yellowstone National Park

Coordinates: 44.29°N 111.07°W

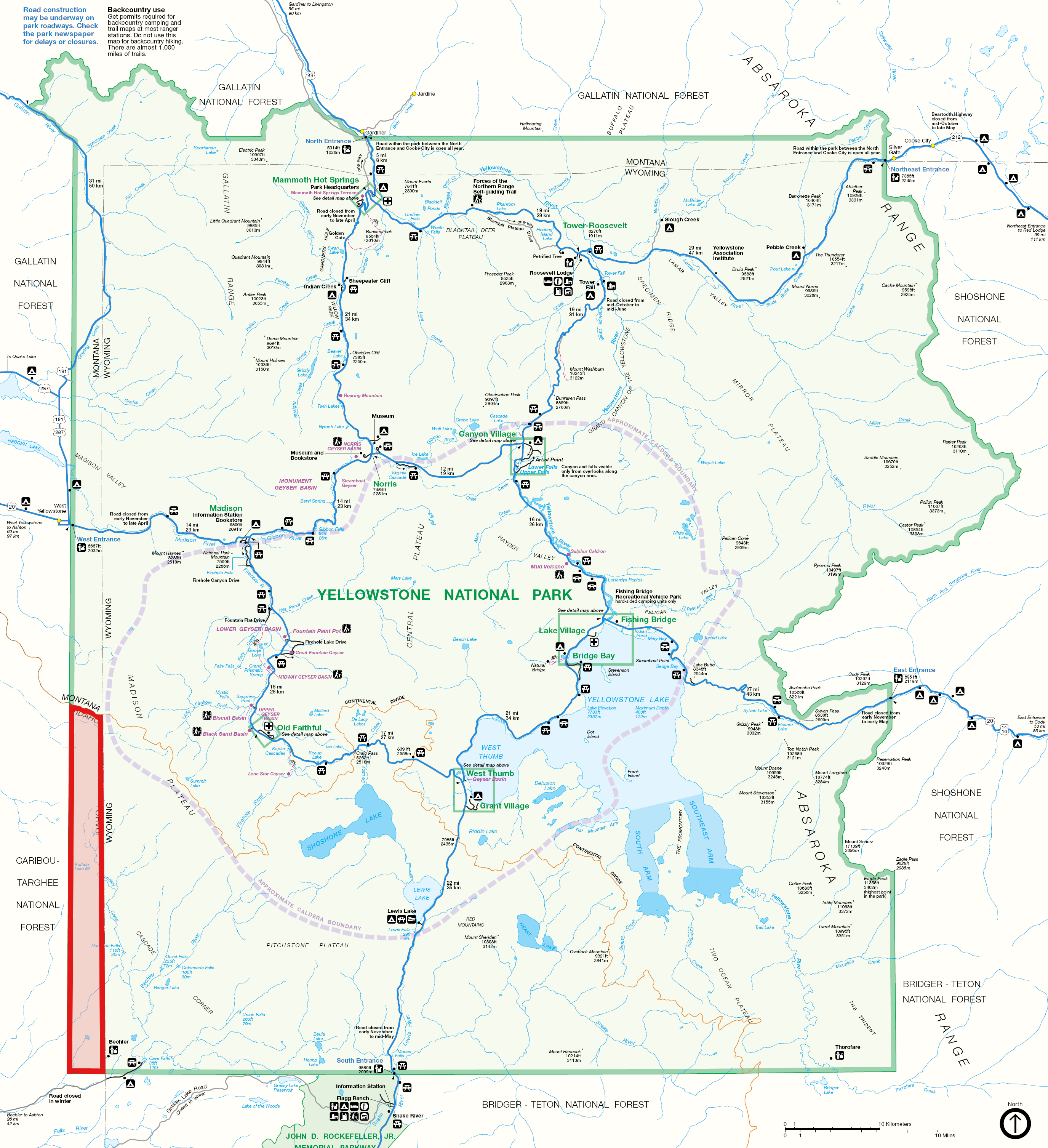
The Zone of Death (highlighted in red) is defined by the intersection of Yellowstone National Park (highlighted in green) with the state of Idaho, in the southwest corner of the park.

The Zone of Death is the 50-square-mile (130 km^{2}) area in the Idaho section of Yellowstone National Park in which, as a result of the Vicinage Clause in the Constitution of the United States, and because this park is a federal enclave, a person may be able theoretically to avoid conviction for any major crime, including murder.

== Loophole ==
The United States District Court for the District of Wyoming is currently the only United States district court to have jurisdiction over parts of multiple states, by reason of its jurisdiction including all of Yellowstone National Park, which extends slightly beyond Wyoming's boundaries into Idaho and Montana. In this regard, the federal government has exclusive jurisdiction over the park, so crimes committed in the park cannot be prosecuted under any of the states' laws.

Trials in the district court are normally held at the federal courthouse in Cheyenne, Wyoming; however, the Sixth Amendment to the United States Constitution decrees that "the accused shall enjoy the right to a speedy and public trial, by an impartial jury of the State and district wherein the crime shall have been committed."[emphasis added]

Because of this, charges for a crime alleged to have been committed in the area of the park in Idaho would have to be tried before a jury consisting entirely of residents of that area. Since the Idaho portion of the park is uninhabited, a jury of residents of both the state and district could not be empaneled.

As the Constitution guarantees the right to a jury trial – which is specified three separate times (Article III, Section 2; Sixth Amendment; Seventh Amendment) – a defendant facing any felony or misdemeanor charge would be unable to receive a constitutional trial, and therefore could not be legally punished regardless of his or her guilt or innocence.

== Discovery ==
The constitutional loophole in this area was discovered in 2004 by Michigan State University law professor Brian C. Kalt while he was planning to write an essay about technicalities of the Sixth Amendment, which entitles criminal defendants to a fair and quick trial. Kalt wondered about a hypothetical place where there were not enough eligible citizens to form a jury and theorized that there could be no trial and therefore no punishment for major crimes in that area. He later realized that there was such a place: the Idaho section of Yellowstone National Park. Horrified by his realization, Kalt shifted his focus to writing an essay about the area to persuade the government to fix the loophole. The essay, which is called "The Perfect Crime", was published in 2005 in The Georgetown Law Journal. Kalt feared that criminals might read the essay and commit a crime in the Zone before the loophole was fixed.

Popular discussion has often alleged that crime is "legal" in the Zone, though Kalt has clarified that the problem instead represents "a reason why it might be harder to prosecute someone for it successfully". A minor crime committed in the Zone that does not require a jury trial would still be subject to prosecution. In addition, a felony committed in the Zone could still potentially be subject to civil litigation, and a criminal could also be prosecuted on conspiracy charges related to planning the crime and traveling into the Zone.

== History ==
After Kalt discovered the loophole, he worked to have Congress close it. He suggested to lawmakers in Wyoming that the Zone of Death be included as part of the federal district court for the District of Idaho instead of the Wyoming district, which would fix the issue. Congress ignored Kalt's suggestion. In 2007, author C. J. Box wrote a novel called Free Fire that featured the Zone, which Box hoped would increase governmental awareness. The novel did succeed in alerting Wyoming Senator Mike Enzi to the issue, but Enzi was unable to convince Congress to discuss it. Although missing person cases nearby have attracted some media attention, no known felonies have been committed in the Zone of Death as of 2026.

In December 2005, a poacher named Michael Belderrain illegally shot an elk in the Montana section of Yellowstone. Belderrain cited Kalt's paper "The Perfect Crime" to explain why he believed it was illegal to have his trial with a jury from a state other than where the crime was committed. The court dismissed this argument. Belderrain took a plea deal which waived his right to a jury trial and prohibited him from appealing the Zone of Death issue to the 10th Circuit, rendering the issue moot, at least for the time being.

== Works of fiction ==
- Population Zero, a 2016 mockumentary about a murder in the area.
- "This is America," a 2019 episode of ABC legal drama For the People.
- The main plot of the novel Free Fire written by C. J. Box centers on four murders that occur in the Zone of Death.
- A recurring plot device in the TV series Yellowstone concerns a location called the "Train Station", described as consisting of "no people, no law enforcement, no judge and jury of your peers, and no one living within a hundred miles" (although the series places this location somewhere along the Montana-Wyoming border). The prequel series 1923 reveals that financier Donald Whitfield first realized this location was the perfect dumping ground for bodies in his war against the Duttons.

== See also ==
- Federal enclave
- Bir Tawil
