= Fire Chasers =

2017 English-language docu-series on Netflix

- Genre: Documentary
- Directed by: Julian T Pinder
- Country of origin: United States
- Original language: English
- No. of seasons: 1
- No. of episodes: 4

Production
- Running time: 50-58 min.

Original release
- Network: Netflix
- Release: September 8, 2017

Fire Chasers is a 2017 English-language original Netflix documentary series produced by Leonardo DiCaprio and directed by Julian T Pinder, showing the dangers of firefighting by exploring the 2016 California fire season.

== Premise ==
Fire Chasers shows the dangers the firefighting men and women face when combating flames using on-helmet cameras and intimate firefighting footage, exploring the 2016 California fire season.

== Episodes ==
No.	Title	Original release date
1	"The New Normal"	September 8, 2017
In California, authorities study environmental changes that fuel increasingly fierce wildfires, and a group of inmates train to become firefighters.
2	"After Burn"	September 8, 2017
Firefighters enter a smoke-filled canyon to combat a deadly blaze. Turning their lives around, two inmates join firefighting crews.
3	"Keep These Jackasses Wet"	September 8, 2017
Homeowners sift through the wreckage left behind by a fire. Rookies face tough training challenges. A veteran firefighter recalls a tragedy.
4	"The Art of Destruction"	September 8, 2017
Rookies get their first taste of going toe-to-toe with the flames. An inmate-firefighter starts her new life, and a fire's detritus becomes artwork.

== Release ==
It was released on September 8, 2017, on Netflix streaming.
