= United States federal judicial district =

Judicial districts

U.S. Court of Appeals and District Court map

In the U.S. federal judicial system, the United States is divided into 94 judicial districts. Each state has at least one judicial district, as do the District of Columbia and Puerto Rico.

Each judicial district contains a United States district court with a bankruptcy court under its authority. There is also a United States Attorney in each district, who acts as the federal government's lawyer in the district, both prosecuting federal criminal cases and defending the government (and its employees) in civil suits against them; the U.S. Attorney is not employed by the judicial branch but by the Department of Justice, part of the executive branch. There is also a Federal Public Defender who represents people charged with federal crimes who cannot afford to hire their own lawyers; some FPDs cover more than one judicial district. Each district also has a United States Marshal who serves the court system.

Federal judicial districts have also been established in the District of Columbia and Puerto Rico. Three territories of the United States — the Virgin Islands, Guam, and the Northern Mariana Islands — have district courts that hear federal cases, including bankruptcy cases; those three courts are territorial courts under Article I of the Constitution, not United States district courts, although they have similar jurisdiction. The breakdown of what is in each judicial district is codified in 28 U.S.C. §§ 81–131. Only two districts have jurisdiction over areas outside the state in which the court sits:

- The District of Wyoming includes all of Yellowstone National Park, including areas in Montana and Idaho. This is the basis for the theory of the Zone of Death.
- The District of Hawaii includes the United States Minor Outlying Islands in the Pacific Ocean: Baker Island, Howland Island, Jarvis Island, Johnston Atoll, Kingman Reef, Midway Atoll, Palmyra Atoll, and Wake Island.

American Samoa and Navassa Island are the only United States territories without a designated federal court. Federal criminal cases arising in these territories, or outside any federal judicial district, are heard in the district where the defendant is arrested, first brought, last resided, or in the District of Columbia. Under this rule, federal criminal cases arising in American Samoa are often heard in the District of Hawaii, and a murder on Navassa Island in 1889 was heard in the District of Maryland.

== Census 1790–1840 ==
From 1790 to 1840 judicial district offices were responsible for census activities, which were in turn conducted by the United States Marshal Service. After the passage of the Census Act of 1840, a central federal census office was established to take charge of census activities.

== List of districts ==
Below is a list of the federal judicial districts and the place(s) where each court "sits" (holds trials) in each district.

Circuit	State	District	Seat(s)
11	Alabama	Northern	Florence, Huntsville, Decatur, Birmingham, Anniston, Tuscaloosa
11	Alabama	Middle	Montgomery, Dothan, Opelika
11	Alabama	Southern	Mobile
9	Alaska		Anchorage, Fairbanks, Juneau, Ketchikan, Nome
9	Arizona		Phoenix, Prescott, Tucson, Yuma, Flagstaff
8	Arkansas	Eastern	Little Rock, Helena, Jonesboro
8	Arkansas	Western	Texarkana, El Dorado, Fort Smith, Harrison, Fayetteville, Hot Springs
9	California	Northern	Eureka, Oakland, San Francisco, San Jose
9	California	Eastern	Fresno, Redding, Sacramento, Bakersfield, Yosemite
9	California	Central	Riverside, Los Angeles, Santa Ana
9	California	Southern	San Diego, El Centro
10	Colorado		Denver, Durango, Grand Junction, Colorado Springs
2	Connecticut		Bridgeport, Hartford, New Haven
3	Delaware		Wilmington
D.C.	District of Columbia		Washington
11	Florida	Northern	Gainesville, Panama City, Pensacola, Tallahassee
11	Florida	Middle	Fort Myers, Jacksonville, Ocala, Orlando, Tampa
11	Florida	Southern	Fort Lauderdale, Fort Pierce, Key West, Miami, West Palm Beach
11	Georgia	Northern	Gainesville, Atlanta, Rome, Newnan
11	Georgia	Middle	Athens, Macon, Columbus, Albany, Valdosta
11	Georgia	Southern	Augusta, Dublin, Savannah, Waycross, Brunswick, Statesboro
9	Hawaii		Honolulu
9	Idaho		Boise, Coeur d'Alene, Moscow, Pocatello
7	Illinois	Northern	Chicago, Rockford
7	Illinois	Central	Urbana, Peoria, Rock Island, Springfield
7	Illinois	Southern	Benton, East St. Louis
7	Indiana	Northern	Fort Wayne, South Bend, Hammond, Lafayette
7	Indiana	Southern	Indianapolis, Terre Haute, Evansville, New Albany
8	Iowa	Northern	Cedar Rapids, Sioux City
8	Iowa	Southern	Des Moines, Council Bluffs, Davenport
10	Kansas		Kansas City, Topeka, Wichita
6	Kentucky	Eastern	Ashland, Covington, Frankfort, Lexington, London, Pikeville
6	Kentucky	Western	Bowling Green, Louisville, Owensboro, Paducah
5	Louisiana	Eastern	New Orleans
5	Louisiana	Middle	Baton Rouge
5	Louisiana	Western	Alexandria, Lafayette, Lake Charles, Monroe, Shreveport
1	Maine		Bangor, Portland
4	Maryland		Baltimore, Greenbelt
1	Massachusetts		Boston, Springfield, Worcester
6	Michigan	Eastern	Ann Arbor, Detroit, Flint, Port Huron, Bay City
6	Michigan	Western	Grand Rapids, Kalamazoo, Lansing, Marquette
8	Minnesota		Saint Paul, Minneapolis, Duluth, Fergus Falls
5	Mississippi	Northern	Aberdeen, Oxford, Greenville
5	Mississippi	Southern	Jackson, Natchez, Gulfport, Hattiesburg
8	Missouri	Eastern	St. Louis, Hannibal, Cape Girardeau
8	Missouri	Western	Kansas City, Joplin, Saint Joseph, Jefferson City, Springfield
9	Montana		Billings, Butte, Great Falls, Helena, Missoula
8	Nebraska		Lincoln, North Platte, Omaha
9	Nevada		Las Vegas, Reno
1	New Hampshire		Concord
3	New Jersey		Camden, Newark, Trenton
10	New Mexico		Albuquerque, Las Cruces, Roswell, Santa Fe
2	New York	Northern	Albany, Binghamton, Plattsburgh, Syracuse, Utica
2	New York	Southern	New York City, White Plains
2	New York	Eastern	Brooklyn, Central Islip
2	New York	Western	Buffalo, Rochester
4	North Carolina	Eastern	Elizabeth City, Fayetteville, Greenville, New Bern, Raleigh, Wilmington
4	North Carolina	Middle	Durham, Greensboro, Winston-Salem
4	North Carolina	Western	Asheville, Charlotte, Statesville
8	North Dakota		Bismarck, Fargo, Grand Forks, Minot
6	Ohio	Northern	Cleveland, Youngstown, Akron, Toledo
6	Ohio	Southern	Cincinnati, Dayton, Columbus
10	Oklahoma	Northern	Tulsa
10	Oklahoma	Eastern	Muskogee
10	Oklahoma	Western	Oklahoma City
9	Oregon		Eugene, Medford, Pendleton, Portland
3	Pennsylvania	Eastern	Allentown, Easton, Reading, Philadelphia
3	Pennsylvania	Middle	Harrisburg, Scranton, Wilkes-Barre, Williamsport
3	Pennsylvania	Western	Erie, Johnstown, Pittsburgh
1	Puerto Rico		San Juan
1	Rhode Island		Providence
4	South Carolina		Charleston, Columbia, Florence, Aiken, Greenville, Anderson, Spartanburg
8	South Dakota		Aberdeen, Sioux Falls, Pierre, Rapid City
6	Tennessee	Eastern	Knoxville, Greeneville, Chattanooga, Winchester
6	Tennessee	Middle	Nashville, Cookeville, Columbia
6	Tennessee	Western	Jackson, Memphis
5	Texas	Northern	Dallas, Fort Worth, Abilene, San Angelo, Amarillo, Wichita Falls, Lubbock
5	Texas	Southern	Galveston, Houston, Laredo, Brownsville, Victoria, Corpus Christi, McAllen
5	Texas	Eastern	Tyler, Beaumont, Sherman, Marshall, Texarkana, Lufkin
5	Texas	Western	Austin, Waco, El Paso, San Antonio, Del Rio, Pecos, Midland, Alpine, Fort Hood
10	Utah		Salt Lake City, St. George
2	Vermont		Brattleboro, Burlington, Rutland
4	Virginia	Eastern	Alexandria, Newport News, Norfolk, Richmond
4	Virginia	Western	Abingdon, Big Stone Gap, Charlottesville, Danville, Harrisonburg, Lynchburg, Roanoke
9	Washington	Eastern	Spokane, Yakima, Richland
9	Washington	Western	Seattle, Tacoma
4	West Virginia	Northern	Clarksburg, Elkins, Martinsburg, Wheeling
4	West Virginia	Southern	Beckley, Bluefield, Charleston, Huntington
7	Wisconsin	Eastern	Green Bay, Milwaukee
7	Wisconsin	Western	Madison
10	Wyoming		Casper, Cheyenne, Mammoth
