= Brian C. Kalt =

American legal scholar and writer (born 1972)

- Born: 1972 (age 53–54)
- Occupations: Academic; author

Academic background
- Education: University of Michigan (BA); Yale University (JD)

Academic work
- Discipline: Law
- Institutions: Michigan State University College of Law
- Main interests: Administrative law; constitutional law; torts

Brian C. Kalt (born 1972) is an American legal scholar at the Michigan State University College of Law, particularly known for his research of the constitution of the United States.

== Career ==
Kalt has taught at Michigan State University College of Law since July 2000. He received tenure in 2006, and has been a full professor and the Harold Norris Faculty Scholar since 2010. He teaches Torts and Administrative Law. His research focuses on structural constitutional law, the presidency, and juries.

Kalt, who received a Bachelor of Arts degree from the University of Michigan, earned his juris doctor from Yale Law School, where he was an editor on the Yale Law Journal. After law school, he served as a law clerk for the Honorable Danny J. Boggs, U.S. Court of Appeals for the 6th Circuit. He then worked as an associate at the Washington, D.C. office of the law firm Sidley Austin. He has occasionally written op-eds for national newspapers.

=== "The Perfect Crime" ===
Kalt's 2005 article "The Perfect Crime" argues that there is a legal loophole which renders it virtually impossible to hold a jury trial for a crime committed in the unpopulated, 50-square-mile (129.50 km^{2}) portion of Yellowstone National Park that lies in Idaho, because of the Sixth Amendment to the U.S. Constitution's Vicinage Clause. As the states have no jurisdiction in Yellowstone, all of Yellowstone is under the geographic jurisdiction of the U.S. District Court for the District of Wyoming. The Vicinage Clause mandates that in federal criminal trials, jurors must be residents of both the "State and district wherein the crime shall have been committed, which district shall have been previously ascertained by law." Because no people live in the strip of land that lies in both the state of Idaho and the Wyoming federal judicial district, no one would be eligible to serve on a jury for a crime which occurred in the area in question, which is consequently sometimes called the Zone of Death.

Since the article's publication, Kalt has called for the U.S. Congress to remedy the situation by assigning the Idaho portion of Yellowstone to the District of Idaho, but as of 2022, no changes have been made. The scenario presented by the loophole has subsequently been depicted in works of fiction, and received further attention with regard to the killing of Gabby Petito in 2021, as Petito was known to have been at nearby Grand Teton National Park in Wyoming before her death. In response to claims on social media that the loophole makes murder "legal" in the zone, Kalt clarified in an interview with PolitiFact that there is no precedent surrounding the matter that would suggest as much, and that the situation "just presents a reason why it might be harder to prosecute someone for it successfully".

=== Impeachment of Donald Trump ===
On the eve of the second impeachment trial of Donald Trump in February 2021, the former president's attorneys filed a brief that made multiple references to a 2001 article on impeachment Kalt had written, asserting he had concluded impeachment of a former president is unconstitutional. Kalt disputed this interpretation, saying that his article had actually concluded there was a "solid basis" for a post-presidential impeachment, and that Trump's lawyers "suggest[ed] that I was endorsing an argument when what I actually did was note that argument—and reject it".

Subsequently, the legal brief of the House of Representatives impeachment managers used Kalt's research to argue that the framers of the U.S. Constitution would likely have supported the impeachment of a former president.

== Selected publications ==
- Unable: The Law, Politics, and Limits of Section 4 of the Twenty-Fifth Amendment (Oxford University Press 2019).
- Constitutional Cliffhangers: A Legal Guide for Presidents and Their Enemies (Yale University Press 2012).
- Sixties Sandstorm: The Fight over Establishment of a Sleeping Bear Dunes National Lakeshore (Michigan State University Press 2001).
- Of Death and Deadlocks: Section 4 of the Twentieth Amendment, 54 HARV. J. ON LEGIS. 101 (2017).
- The Ninth Amendment in Congress, 40 PEPPERDINE L. REV. 75 (2012).
- Tabloid Constitutionalism: How a Bill Doesn't Become a Law, 96 GEO. L.J. 1971 (2008).
- Keeping Recess Appointments in Their Place, 101 NW. U. L. REV. COLLOQUY 88 (2007), http://www.law.northwestern.edu/lawreview/colloquy/2007/3/
- Crossing Eight Mile: Juries of the Vicinage and County-Line Criminal Buffer Statutes, 80 WASH. L. REV. 271 (2005).
- The Perfect Crime, 93 GEO. L.J. 675 (2005), reprinted in THE GREEN BAG ALMANAC AND READER 2006 in the category of "Exemplary Legal Writing 2005."
- The Exclusion of Felons from Jury Service, 53 AM. U. L. REV. 65 (2003).
- The Constitutional Case for the Impeachability of Former Federal Officials: An Analysis of the Law, History, and Practice of Late Impeachment, 6 TEX. REV. L. & POL. 13 (2001).
- Note, Pardon Me?: The Constitutional Case Against Presidential Self-Pardons, 106 YALE L.J. 779 (1996).
