= Jury Selection and Service Act =

The United States Jury Selection and Service Act of 1968, or "Jury Act", 28 U.S.C. § 1861 et seq, provides the judicial structure for the selection of United States federal juries. The Jury Act provides:

It is the policy of the United States that all litigants in Federal courts entitled to trial by jury shall have the right to grand and petit juries selected at random from a fair cross section of the community in the district or division wherein the court convenes. It is further the policy of the United States that all citizens shall have the opportunity to be considered for service on grand and petit juries in the district courts of the United States, and shall have an obligation to serve as jurors when summoned for that purpose.

== Measures that increased representation of a fair cross section of the community ==
The Jury Act scrapped the "key man" system of "blue ribbon juries", in which jury commissioners typically solicited the names of "men of recognized intelligence and probity" from notables or "key men" of the community. A 1967 survey of federal courts showed that 60 percent still relied primarily on this so-called key man system for the names of jurors.

The Jury Act provides that each United States District Court shall create a list of names of prospective jurors, culled from voter registration lists or lists of actual voters, and supplemented through other sources of names if necessary to achieve a fair cross section of the community and prevent discrimination. The list must consist at least 1,000 names, and preferably at least one-half of 1 per centum of the total number of persons on the lists used as source of names for the district or division. These names are loaded into a jury wheel, which must be emptied and refilled at least once every four years.

== Remaining potential for bias ==
These minimum requirements allow some room for bias to occur. For instance, residents of a judicial district who are under the age of 18 may be excluded from the electorate by reason of youth and hence not be among those whose names are loaded into the jury wheel. If the jury wheel is only emptied and reloaded once every four years, by the end of the fourth year, the jury wheel will not contain the names of any residents under the age of 22.

Also, if some groups of citizens (e.g., young people) are less likely than others to be registered to vote, then the jury selection process will tend to underrepresent them, unless the voter registration list or list of actual voters is supplemented by other lists in which those groups are more adequately represented. Even with such supplementation, some minorities may be underrepresented if members of those minorities have a greater than average occurrence of certain characteristics that tend to disqualify them from jury service. For instance, relatively transient groups (such as students) may have less opportunity to serve because of the requirement of living one year or more within the judicial district, and because they have to wait until the next time names are added to the jury wheel before they can be selected. Some groups, such as the elderly, may be underrepresented because they are statistically more likely to be incapable, by reason of mental or physical infirmity, to render satisfactory jury service. Some minorities may be underrepresented because they have a statistically higher tendency to have felony convictions or pending felony charges which disqualify them from serving.
