= Petit jury =

Hears the evidence in a trial as presented by both the plaintiff and the defendant

In common law, a petit jury (or trial jury; pronounced /ˈpɛtət/ or /pəˈtiːt/, depending on the jurisdiction) hears the evidence in a trial as presented by both the plaintiff (petitioner) and the defendant (respondent). After hearing sworn testimony, jury instructions (US) or jury directions (England and Wales) from the judge, the jury retires for deliberation, to consider a verdict. The majority required for a verdict varies. In some cases it must be unanimous, while in other jurisdictions it may be a majority or supermajority. A jury that is unable to come to a verdict is referred to as a hung jury. The size of the jury varies; in criminal cases involving serious felonies there are usually 12 jurors, although Scotland uses 15. A number of countries that are not in the English common law tradition have quasi-juries on which lay judges or jurors and professional judges deliberate together regarding criminal cases. However, the common law trial jury is the most common type of jury system.

In civil cases many trials require fewer than twelve jurors. Outside the US and Canada, common law jurisdictions may use juries in claims for defamation, negligence, and eminent domain. Generally, civil law legal systems do not use civil juries. Civil juries are available in the United States and Canada in almost all cases where the only remedy sought is money damages.

== See also ==
- Coroner's jury
- Grand jury
- Jury
