= Virtual jury research =

Lawyer technique

Virtual jury research is a technique used by lawyers to prepare for trial.

For many decades, attorneys have employed jury consultants to conduct jury research to help prepare for trial. The goals of such research vary: to assess the case and to discover its primary juror-defined issues; to help plan the case presentation; to develop the trial theme that will resonate most strongly with jurors; and, of course, to determine with the maximum degree of probability the most likely trial outcome.

Jury research is similar to the test marketing of products that companies conduct before they introduce them commercially. Jury consultants utilize numerous tools and techniques to assist attorneys with this research. These include jury focus groups and jury simulations (mock trials) involving surrogate (mock) jurors; venue studies, including phone and other surveys to determine community attitudes regarding an upcoming trial; witness preparations; and more.

Jury research is useful not only for trials but also for litigation disputes of all types, including those with outcomes that will be determined through ADR (alternative dispute resolution methodologies such as arbitration, mediation, or negotiations).

== Methodology ==
Virtual jury research is based on the concept of synchronous conferencing, also known as computer-mediated communication. Like Internet Relay Chat (IRC), all communication between participants during a virtual jury research study take place in real time. Attorneys access the Internet from their own PCs to participate in the virtual jury research sessions. They are joined by virtual research jurors (mock jurors) who have been selected so that their individual profiles match key criteria that support the case study’s particular design objectives.

== Online jury research ==
In addition to conventional jury research, attorneys in recent years have been able to conduct online jury focus group testing over the Internet. Online jury research, known as "virtual jury research", features the same type of empirically valid research data concerning juror decision-making that conventional jury research provides. One of the first people to develop this technology were trial consultants Adrienne LeFevre and Teresa Rosado. They formed OnlineVerdict.com and have since become nationally known for their technology and advances in online research.

== Online focus group "room" ==
For virtual jury research, the focus group "room" (or chatroom) where the virtual jurors, attorneys, and jury consultants interact is a special computer screen window that all can access. There, the research jurors are presented with specific questions designed to gauge their attitudes and concerns regarding the case being studied. They type in their responses to these questions, which are immediately viewable by all participants.

== Results ==
Through this online jury research process, attorneys and jury consultants are able to spotlight the key trial issues the online research jurors consider most important; and to then determine with the maximum degree of available certainty how these issues should be presented during the upcoming trial to achieve courtroom success. Findings can be used to forecast jury verdicts; detect possible juror bias; evaluate demonstrative aids; plan trial strategy, and so on.

== Comparison to standardized jury research ==
Virtual jury research provides identical benefits to standardized jury research, while featuring numerous additional advantages, including more economical costs. The primary benefit, by far, is quick case study results. A customary jury research session often takes weeks to organize and administer. But with virtual jury research which benefits from the availability online of literally millions of potential case study participants—research jurors can quickly be located and solicited to participate, which they can do so effortlessly via their home computers. As a result, online studies can be organized, conducted, concluded, and evaluated within a few hours. This quick turnaround can be invaluable for attorneys who must quickly strategize regarding sudden new cases that must quickly go to trial.

== "Stratified" sampling ==
Like any other scientific study, the validity of jury research results is based on the quality of the scientific sample, in this case the actual research jurors who are being studied. For online jury research, this means that the individual characteristics of the virtual jurors who participate in the jury study should match as closely as possible with those of a hypothetical "ideal" juror for a particular case. In most jury research, these characteristics segment according to the following criteria: demographics, personality, attitudes, beliefs and life experience. Choosing research jurors on the basis of these individual characteristics is known as "stratified" sampling.

== "Random" sampling and "representative" sampling ==
In standardized jury research, which draws on a pool of research jurors who are limited to a single venue, quickly locating and securing the services of jurors with such ideal characteristics can be a daunting if not impossible task. This is why standardized jury research often is conducted instead on the basis of "random" sampling (based on lists derived through voter registration, driver license applications, and so on); or through "representative" sampling (based only on demographic characteristics—age, ethnicity, sex, and so on). However, these much less refined methodologies do not present the same type of scientifically valid and meaningful research results that can be achieved through stratified sampling. But with the Internet, and its hundreds of millions of users worldwide, stratified sampling is not a problem; hence the value of virtual jury research in comparison to more standardized formats.

== See also ==
- Focus group
- Jury research
- Mock trial
- Verdict
- Voir dire
