= Stealth juror =

Someone who attempts to sit on a jury in order to influence the outcome of the legal case

A stealth juror or rogue juror is a person who, motivated by a hidden agenda in reference to a legal case, attempts to be seated on the jury and to influence the outcome. Legal scholars believe that lawyers can identify stealth jurors by paying close attention to non-verbal behavior connected with deception and identifying discrepancies between answers to oral voir dire and written questionnaires. A potential stealth juror may be hard to read and excessively reserved. The potential for stealth jurors to nullify death penalty statutes has prompted calls to eliminate the requirement of a unanimous verdict in jury trials. On the other hand, the argument has been raised that stealth jurors can serve as a defense against bad laws.

Clay Conrad has stated that libertarian-minded voir dire members can and should increase their odds of getting on a jury by telling the prosecutors what they want to hear, without actually lying. Jurors who lie to get on a jury can be charged with such offenses as contempt of court and obstruction of justice. Background checks are increasingly being used to catch jurors who lie about their criminal records.

== Incidents ==
Three stealth jurors allegedly lied to get on the jury in the trial of Scott Peterson for the murder of his wife Laci Peterson. Peterson's lawyers argued that "[b]y getting on a nationally famous case, [these jurors] may have aspirations of working their jury service into a book, interviews or some other form of celebrity and possible monetary benefit." The lawyers argued that Peterson would have a better chance of getting a fair trial outside of Los Angeles, the entertainment capital of the world, since many of the jurors there might be publicity hungry. After the Martha Stewart trial, a juror who gave several media interviews after the conviction was accused by Stewart's lawyers of misconduct by lying to get on the jury. His statements to the media after the verdict proclaiming Stewart's conviction as a "victory for the little guy who loses money in the markets because of these types of transactions" were used by the lawyers for the defendants to argue that the verdict was tainted by this juror's alleged agenda to convict.

In June 2008, after a judge, during deliberations in a "gang murder" trial, dismissed a juror who was found to have falsely denied her gang affiliation on a jury selection questionnaire, San Mateo County Chief Deputy District Attorney Steve Wagstaffe said: "It is our subjective opinion that she was a stealth juror, that she specifically wanted to be on this jury." Juror dishonesty on questionnaires threatened the six-month-long federal corruption trial of former Illinois Governor George Ryan.

== In popular culture ==
John Grisham's book The Runaway Jury is about a stealth juror who—having made very meticulous, year-long preparations—serves in a tobacco-related case and by a variety of tricks manages to get other members of the jury to vote the way he intended. The film based on it is about a stealth juror in a gun-related case.
