= North Carolina Jury Selection Policies =

The North Carolina jury selection policies govern a process used to find a panel of jurors who will be fair and impartial to both sides during a trial. North Carolina jury selection policies are documented in the North Carolina General Statutes § 9-1 through 9-9. These policies were originally passed in 1967, and they were revised in 2011. Jury selection is the procedure whereby persons from the community are called to court, questioned by the litigants as to their qualifications to serve as a juror and then either selected or rejected to serve as a juror.

== Voir dire ==
North Carolina selects jurors through the use of voir dire, which permits involved parties to ask questions of potential jurors for the purpose of determining whether or not these jurors should serve on the case. Voir dire has aims to get potential jurors speaking about themselves and to elicit truthful and complete answers from potential jurors.

== Process according to North Carolina General Statutes ==
=== The jury commission ===
To begin the process, North Carolina General Statute § 9-1 requires that (no later than July 1, 1967), each county shall appoint a jury commission of three members. One member of the commission shall be appointed by the senior regular resident superior court judge, one member by the clerk of superior court, and one member by the board of county commissioners. These members serve for a term or two years, and appointees may be reappointed to successive terms. The three-member committee chooses jurors from a master list that they compile using the policies that are given in G.S. § 9-1 through 9-9.,

=== The master jury list ===
During every odd-numbered year, the jury commission is charged with the duty of preparing a master list of prospective jurors who are qualified to serve beginning on January 1 of the next year. The master list must be created from a record of all the registered voters and persons with drivers license records. The jury commission may also use names from other lists as long as those lists are deemed reliable by that commission. Once this list is created, the commission must merge the names from each source used and randomly select the desired number of names for the master jury list. This process may be carried out using electronic data processing equipment in the counties that have the necessary equipment to do so. The jury commission shall continue to make decisions as to mental or physical competency of prospective jurors. In order to ensure random selection of names from the master list, the list is to be sorted into random order before the first panel is drawn, and after the first panel, names may be selected sequentially from the randomized list without having to be further randomized.

The process for preparing the master jury list must be recorded and approved by the commission, and these documents must be made available to the public for inspection in the office of the clerk of court. After the master jury list is prepared, the name of each qualified person selected for the list shall be recorded and alphabetically arranged. The office of the clerk of court is charged with maintaining the alphabetized list along with a statement of the sources used and procedures followed in preparing the list. The alphabetized list must be kept under lock and key, but it shall be made available for public inspection during regular office hours. The clerk of court may elect to store an electronic copy of the alphabetized list for the county. However, public access to juror information shall be limited to the alphabetized list of the names with no access to the addresses, which are confidential and not subject to discloser without an order of the court.

=== Procedure for drawing a panel of jurors ===
At least 30 days prior to any district or superior court cases that require a jury, either the clerk, assistant clerk, or deputy clerk must prepare a randomized list of potential jurors from the master jury list. The number of names on this randomized list must be equal to the number of jurors required for the scheduled session or sessions. In order to account for jurors whose duty has been deferred until this session, the clerk of superior court may decide to decrease the number of names on the randomized list. For each week of superior court sessions, the senior resident superior court judge for the district(s) shall specify the number of jurors to be drawn. For each week of district court jury session, the chief district judge of the district court district in which the county is located shall specify the number of jurors to be drawn. The clerk of superior court then may either prepare and issue the summons from that office or may deliver the printed list of summonses or list of names and addresses of jurors to the sheriff, who will then issue the summonses in accordance with the provisions of G.S, 9-10(a). The persons who are summoned may serve as jurors in either the superior court or district court or both for the week specified, and they will be discharged at the end of the weekly session(s), unless they are involved with a trial of a case, in which case they will be discharged when the trial is completed..

== Qualifications of prospective jurors ==
According to the North Carolina General Statutes, all persons are qualified to serve as jurors and to be included on the master jury list who are citizens of the State and residents of the county. Also, prospective jurors will qualify who have not served as jurors during the preceding two years, who are 18 years of age or over, who are physically and mentally competent, who can hear and understand the English language. In addition, those who have not been convicted of a felony or having pleaded guilty or nolo contendere to an indictment charging a felony (or if convicted of a felony or having pleaded guilty or nolo contendere to an indictment charging a felony have had their citizenship restored pursuant to law), and who have not been adjudged non compos mentis. Anyone who does not qualify under these terms are subject to challenge for cause.

== Excusal ==
Jury service is a public duty, which means that jury service is the solemn obligation of all qualified citizens. For that reason, excuses from the discharge of this responsibility should be granted only for reasons of compelling personal hardship or because requiring service would be contrary to the public welfare, health, or safety. After a citizen applies for excusal from service, each chief district court judge shall receive, hear, and pass on applications for excuses from jury duty prior to the date on which the jury session convenes. The time and place for which applications for excuses will be heard must be publicly announced, and prospective jurors must be informed of this time and place. In North Carolina counties in which a trial court administrator is in place, the trial court administrator may be assigned the duty of reviewing applications for excuses from service. If a prospective juror is excused from duty at that time, that juror may be required to serve as a juror in a subsequent session of court, at which time that juror would be considered the same as if he were regularly summoned for service.

Any person summoned as a juror who is 72 years or older and who wishes to be excused, deferred, or exempted may make the request without appearing in person by filing a signed statement on the ground of the request with the chief district court judge pursuant to G.S. 9-6(b), at any time five business days before the date upon which the person is summoned to appear. Anyone who is summoned as a juror who has a disability that could interfere with that person's ability to serve as a juror and who wishes to be excused, deferred, or exempted may make the request without appearing in person. The person must file a signed statement of the ground of the request, and this statement must include a brief explanation of the disability that interferes with the person's ability to serve as a juror. The statement must be filed with the chief district court judge of that district or the district court judge or trial court administrator who is designated by the chief district court judge pursuant to G.S. 9-6(b), and this must be done five business days before the date on which the person is summoned to appear.

It is possible for a person to request either a temporary or permanent exemption (under G.S. 9-6(c)), and it is up to the judge or trial court administrator to accept or reject either in the exercise of discretion conferred by G.S. 9-6(b). This includes the substitution of a temporary exemption for a requested permanent exemption. If the chief district court judge or the judge or trial court administrator (designated by G.S. 9-6(b) rejects the request for exemption, the prospective juror must immediately be notified of that decision by the trial court administrator or the clerk of court, and this can be done by telephone, letter, or in person.

== Jurors Who Have Served ==
The names of individuals who have been summoned for jury service as well as the dates on which the individuals have served must be noted on the master jury list. This information will be kept for two years, and those individuals will be exempt from jury service for two years from the date on which they were discharged from their prior service.
