= Jury selection =

Process of choosing jury members

Jury selection is the selection of the people who will serve on a jury during a jury trial. The group of potential jurors (the "jury pool,” also known as the venire) is first selected from among the community using a reasonably random method. Jury lists are compiled from voter registrations and driver license or ID renewals. From those lists, summonses are mailed. A panel of jurors is then assigned to a courtroom.

The prospective jurors are randomly selected to sit in the jury box. At this stage, they will be questioned in court by the judge and/or attorneys in the United States. Depending on the jurisdiction, attorneys may have an opportunity to mount a challenge for cause argument or use one of a limited number of peremptory challenges.

In some jurisdictions that have capital punishment, the jury must be death-qualified to remove those who are opposed to the death penalty. Jury selection and techniques for voir dire are taught to law students in trial advocacy courses. However, attorneys sometimes use expert assistance in systematically choosing the jury via a process of scientific jury selection, although other uses of jury research are becoming more common. The jury selected is said to have been "empaneled".

== Voir dire ==
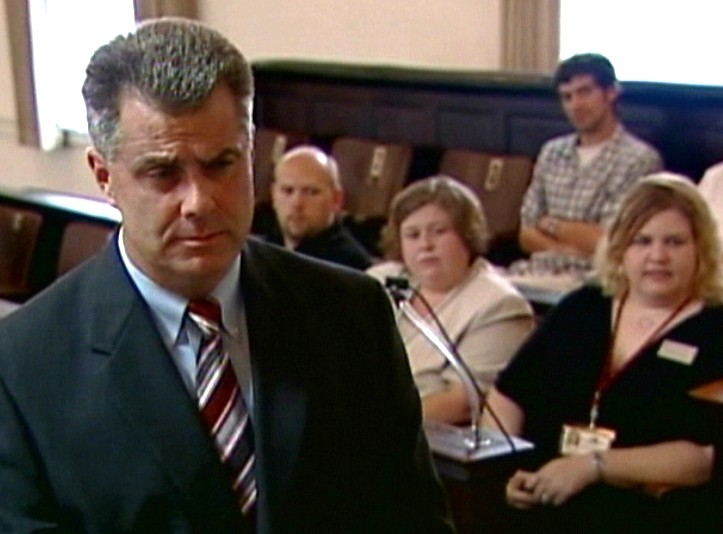
Depiction of an attorney asking questions during jury selection

Selected jurors are generally subjected to a system of examination whereby both the prosecution (or plaintiff, in a civil case) and defence can object to a juror. In common law countries, this is known as voir dire. Voir dire can include both general questions asked of an entire pool of prospective jurors, answered by means such as a show of hands, and questions asked of individual prospective jurors and calling for a verbal answer. In some jurisdictions, the attorneys for the parties may question the potential jurors; in other jurisdictions, the trial judge conducts the voir dire.

The method and scope of the possible rejections varies between countries:

- In England, these objections would have to be well based, such as the defendant knowing a potential juror, to be allowed.
- Some jurisdictions, including Australia, France, New Zealand, Northern Ireland, the Republic of Ireland, and the United States, give both the defense and the prosecution a specific number of unconditional peremptory challenges. No justifications have to be brought to exclude a specific juror. Generally, defense attorneys exclude jurors who have professions or backgrounds similar to that of the victim and who could thus feel an emotional link to them, while prosecuting attorneys exclude jurors who might show affinity to the defendant. However, in the United States, if either party excludes a minority group member and the other party challenges, under Batson rules the party exercising the peremptory strike must provide a race-neutral reason for the exclusion (later extended by court rulings to gender-neutral reasons as well). Parties have been known to peremptorily strike jurors based on personal characteristics that wouldn't justify a strike for cause, but which they believe makes the juror less likely to be sympathetic to their side.
- In some jurisdictions, attorneys also have the right to make a challenge for cause argument to the judge. This is an argument over whether a juror's particular background or beliefs make them biased and therefore unsuitable for service on the jury.

=== United States ===
In the United States the process of voir dire is often much more in-depth than in other countries and its practical implementation is somewhat controversial because of this. The amount of privacy that the potential jurors are afforded when asked questions raises the issue of the definition of "impartial jury". Some people are skeptical as to whether the intensive questioning of potential jurors looks not just for inherent bias but for a potential to be emotionally swayed. On the other hand, proponents argue that this method gives both sides more confidence in the verdict.

Generally, the prosecution and the defense want the maximum amount of information about the jurors, so that they can estimate which people are most likely to be sympathetic to their case. Although the practice is opposed by the American Bar Association in their "Standards on Juror Use and Management", prosecutors, defense attorneys, and news media can in most cases legally take some of the information jurors disclose, such as their home addresses, and use it to investigate the jurors outside the court through such means as running criminal background checks or simply driving past the jurors' homes to see what information they can glean from its appearance. These independent investigations usually happen without any notice to the jurors, the court, or other parties in the case.

=== Canada ===
Part XX of the Criminal Code of Canada allows for a jury in a Canadian murder trial to consist of twelve jurors. However, a minimum of ten jurors and a maximum of 14 jurors may hear the evidence for a trial. At the end of the trial, a maximum of twelve jurors and a minimum of ten jurors may deliberate.

Section 631(2.2) as well as section 643 of the Criminal Code specify that a jury may consist of either 12, 13, or 14 members; however, 12 is most common. Section 631(2.2) allows a judge to order that 13 or 14 jurors be sworn in under certain circumstances.

Jurors may also be excused during trial. According to section 644(1) of the Criminal Code, a judge may discharge any juror during the trial due to illness or "other reasonable cause," such as impartiality (see R v Tsouma (1973) and R v Holcomb (1973)). Section 644(2) further specifies that a jury is still properly constituted to complete its duties even if a juror is discharged during the trial, as long as the number of jurors is not reduced below ten.

At the conclusion of the trial and following the jury charge, a maximum of twelve jurors may deliberate. It requires the judge to pull numbers from a box to determine which jurors should be discharged in order to reduce the number of jurors down to twelve.

Jury identification

When empaneling the jury, section 631(3) of the Criminal Code states that the court clerk will draw out the appropriate number of juror cards and read out the name and number of each card in the courtroom. In this sense, the identity of the jurors will be revealed to all parties. However, s. 631(3.1) goes on to say that a judge can order that the clerk of the court shall only call out the number on each card, thereby withholding the names of the jury members. This generally takes place upon application by the prosecutor or when the judge deems it necessary to protect the safety and privacy of the jury members.

Under s. 631(6) of the Code, the presiding judge may then make an order either directing that the identity of a jury member or any information that could reveal their identity not be published or broadcast in any way, or limiting access to or the use of that information. These amendments to s. 361 were introduced in 2001, with the purpose of "protecting jurors from intimidation and enabling jurors to participate effectively by making them free to act without being subjected to threats, prejudice, intimidation, or physical injury."

Peremptory challenges

In Canada, the number of peremptory challenges (i.e., challenges for which no reason is given) for jury selection was governed by Section 634 of the Criminal Code of Canada.

§634 of the Criminal Code of Canada was repealed by Bill C-75, which came into effect on September 19, 2019, and peremptory challenges have therefore been eliminated.

Challenge for cause

Section 638 of the Criminal Code of Canada provides the basis upon which an individual juror may be challenged for cause. A party seeking to challenge a prospective juror’s partiality must first demonstrate to the court that there is an ‘air of reality’ to the application. A party may do this by establishing that there is a realistic potential for partiality.

Section 640 of the Criminal Code sets out the procedures for dealing with a challenge for cause. A challenge for cause based on the enumerated grounds under section 638, other than the juror’s name not appearing on the panel, will be tried by the last two jurors to be sworn. If no Jurors have been sworn, the judge will appoint two persons to try the challenge for cause. Upon application by the accused, the court may exercise its discretion to exclude all sworn and unsworn jurors from the courtroom until the challenge for cause is decided. The two triers of the challenge for cause must decide the question on a balance of probabilities.

Pre-hearing conference

Part XX of the Criminal Code of Canada provides for Procedure in Jury Trials. Section 625.1 of the Criminal Code of Canada is the authority for a pre-hearing conference.

A pre-hearing conference is a conference held before the beginning of a trial. It is held between the prosecutor and the accused (or counsel for the accused) and is presided over by the court. The purpose of a pre-hearing conference is to promote a fair and expeditious trial. It considers matters that would be better decided before the start of the trial and makes arrangements for the decisions of those matters.

Either the prosecutor, defense, or the judge may initiate a motion for a pre-hearing conference.

A pre-hearing conference is mandatory for any case to be tried by a jury (per s. 625.1(2) of the Criminal Code of Canada). It must be presided over by a judge of the court that will try the accused and must be held in accordance with the rules of court made under sections 482 and 482.1.

Case Law: A pre-hearing conference judge does not have the jurisdiction to review the Crown disclosure decisions or to order disclosure.

== Death qualification ==
In United States capital cases (cases where the prosecution pursues the death penalty), the jury must often be "death-qualified". A death-qualified jury is one in which all members of the venire that categorically object to capital punishment are removed. This has the effect of ensuring that the jury will be willing to hand down a sentence of death, if they feel the crime warrants it. The United States Supreme Court has ruled that the practice is constitutional. Critics object to death-qualification because empirical evidence has shown that death-qualified jurors are more likely to convict defendants of crimes than are jurors generally.

== Assistance of experts ==
In the 1970s and 1980s in the United States, scientific jury selection—the use of expert assistance to more effectively use peremptory challenges — became more common. The practice has proven controversial because of fears that it gives lawyers the ability to "fix" the jury and enhances the distorting effect of money. However, research indicates that the effect of the practice is modest at best.

Currently, the more generic jury consulting or jury research is increasingly more common as attorneys trying high-stakes cases demand assistance through all parts of the trial process. The still more generic field of trial consulting also contains a myriad of other tools and techniques not directly related to juries.

== Criticism ==
Jury packing is "illegally or corruptly influencing a jury by making available for jury service persons known to be biased or partial in a particular case to be tried". The term also is applied pejoratively to jury selection procedures which are legal but perceived as unfair. In the nineteenth century, the prosecution had unlimited peremptory challenges in England and Ireland, whereas the defence were limited to six in England or 20 in Ireland. Peter O'Brien as Crown Prosecutor during the Irish Land War was nicknamed "Peter the Packer" by supporters of the Irish Land League. The pool from which a jury panel is selected may not have the same demographics as the general population; until the nineteenth century or later in multiple jurisdictions, jury service, as with the electoral franchise, was restricted to male property owners.

In three studies of legal authoritarianism, attitudes toward psychiatrists, and attitude toward the insanity defense were examined as predictors of conviction-proneness in insanity defense cases. According to Fahringer (1994), 85% of cases litigated are won or lost in the jury selection phase.

== See also ==
- Jury questionnaire
- Runaway Jury (film)
- Sortition
- Strike for cause
- Voir dire
