= The Runaway Jury =

1996 novel by John Grisham

- First edition cover
- Author: John Grisham
- Language: English
- Genre: Legal thriller
- Publisher: Doubleday Books
- Publication date: 1996
- Publication place: United States
- Media type: Print (hardback & paperback)
- Pages: 414 pp (first edition, hardback)
- ISBN: 0-385-47294-3 (first edition, hardback)
- OCLC: 34208175
- Dewey Decimal: 813/.54 20
- LC Class: PS3557.R5355 R8 1996

The Runaway Jury is a 1996 legal thriller novel written by American author John Grisham. It was Grisham's seventh novel.

A movie adaptation of the novel starring Gene Hackman, Dustin Hoffman, John Cusack and Rachel Weisz was released in 2003. It was the third appearance of Gene Hackman in a Grisham novel movie adaptation, after The Firm and The Chamber.

== Plot ==
Wendall Rohr and his team of tort lawyers have filed suit on behalf of plaintiff Celeste Wood, whose husband died of lung cancer, against the tobacco company Pynex. The trial is to be held in Biloxi, Mississippi, a state thought to have favorable tort laws and sympathetic juries. Before the jury in the Pynex trial has been sworn in, a stealth juror, Nicholas Easter, has successfully gotten himself added to the jury, in concert with a mysterious woman known only as Marlee.

Rankin Fitch, a shady "consultant" who has directed eight successful trials for the tobacco industry, has placed a camera in the courtroom in order to observe the proceedings in his office nearby, where he and his team analyze the jury and plan to manipulate them. He plans to get to Millie Dupree through blackmailing her husband through a tape that has him trying to bribe an official. He gets to Lonnie Shaver by convincing a company to buy his employer and convince him through orientation. He also tries to reach Rikki Coleman through blackmail of revealing her abortion to her husband. As the case continues, Fitch is approached by Marlee with a proposal to "buy" the verdict.

Meanwhile, Easter works from the inside to gain control of the jury – being warm-hearted, sympathetic and helpful to jurors who might be won over, and ruthless to those who prove impervious to his efforts. Eventually, he becomes jury foreman after the previous one falls ill (resulting from Easter spiking his coffee). He also manages to hoodwink and repeatedly manipulate the judge. Meanwhile, Marlee – Easter's partner/lover – acts as his agent on the outside, convincing Fitch, through a series of highly secretive meetings, that Easter controls the jury and can deliver any verdict on demand.

Marlee gives Fitch the impression that the pair's objective is purely mercenary – to sell the verdict to highest bidder. Still, he makes a great effort to discover her true name and antecedents to satisfy his mounting curiosity. This turns out to be extremely difficult, and the detectives employed by Fitch express their grudging respect for her skill in concealing her tracks. As the trial reaches its climax, Fitch – still in the dark about Marlee's past – agrees to her proposal to pay $10 million for a favorable verdict. Only after the money is irrevocably transferred to an offshore account do the detectives discover the truth: Marlee is in fact an anti-smoking activist whose parents both died from tobacco use. Thus, Fitch realizes that he lost Pynex's $10 million in addition to having lost the trial.

Inside the closed jury room, Easter convinces the jury to find for the plaintiff and make a large monetary award – $2 million in compensatory damages and $400 million in punitive damages. While not able to sway the entire jury, Easter gets nine out of twelve jurors to back him – sufficient for a valid verdict in a civil case. Pynex and its defense lawyers are devastated. In the Cayman Islands, Marlee short-sells the tobacco companies' stocks and makes an enormous gain on the original $10 million. Easter quickly disappears from Biloxi and leaves the U.S. While Easter and Marlee are now wealthy and satisfied that they served justice, the tobacco industry, once undefeatable, is now vulnerable to an avalanche of additional lawsuits.

The book closes with Marlee returning the initial $10 million bribe to Fitch, having almost doubled the money on the derivatives market, and warning Fitch that she and Easter will always be watching. She explains that she had no intention to steal or lie, and that she cheated only because, "That was all your client understood."

== Critical reception ==
The New York Times wrote: "The story's suspense builds like that of a lengthening cigarette ash that refuses to drop off. And the plot's eventual outcome is far more entertainingly unpredictable than anything Mr. Grisham has done before." The Chicago Tribune wrote that "the guts of the book is the cat-and-mouse game played by Marlee, Easter and Fitch, and it is probably Grisham's best storytelling to date."

== Editions ==
The hardcover first edition was published by Doubleday Books in 1996 (ISBN 0-385-47294-3). Pearson Longman released the graded reader edition in 2001 (ISBN 0-582-43405-X). The novel was published again in 2003 to coincide with the release of the movie adaptation. The third printing (ISBN 0-440-22147-1) bears a movie-themed cover, in place of the covers used on the first and second printings.
