= Jury questionnaire =

A jury questionnaire is a form that potential jurors fill out prior to voir dire. Many jurisdictions "qualify" jurors by selecting only those who receive, complete, and return jury questionnaires. Some studies have found that large percentages of jury questionnaires are returned as undeliverable or are not returned by the recipients.

Supplemental juror questionnaires are used in virtually all high-profile cases. Research has found that potential jurors are more willing to disclose bias in juror questionnaires than in oral voir dire.

== See also ==
- Jury selection
