= Minnie Weisz =

English photographer and visual artist

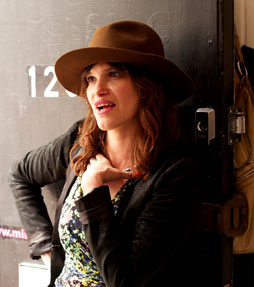
- Weisz in 2012
- Born: Anna Alexandra Weisz; London, England
- Occupation(s): Visual artist, photographer
- Relatives: Rachel Weisz (sister)

Anna Alexandra "Minnie" Weisz is an English photographer and visual artist who specialises in the camera obscura technique. She is the younger sister of actress Rachel Weisz.

== Early life and education ==
Anna Alexandra Weisz was born in London. Her father, George Weisz (1929–2020), was a Hungarian Jewish mechanical engineer. Her mother, Edith Ruth (née Teich; 1932–2016), was a teacher-turned-psychotherapist from Vienna, Austria. Her parents left for the United Kingdom around 1938, before the outbreak of the Second World War, to escape the Nazis. Scholar Rev. James Parkes helped her mother and her mother's family leave Austria for England. Her mother's ancestry is Austrian-Jewish, Catholic Viennese and Italian; Weisz's mother formally converted to Judaism upon marrying Weisz's father.

Weisz's maternal grandfather was Alexander Teich, a Jewish activist who had been a secretary of the World Union of Jewish Students. Her older sister, Rachel Weisz, is an Academy Award-winning actress.

Weisz received an MA in Communication Art and Design at the Royal College of Art and a BA in Graphic and Media Design at London College of Printing.

== Career ==
Weisz specialises in the camera obscura and adapts the technique to turn entire rooms into cameras, across Europe. She has described herself (with respect to her artistic activity) as an architectural detective.

== Exhibitions ==
- King's Cross Stories, exhibition and film, Great Northern Hotel, part of the Arrivals season, King's Cross, London, 14–17 November 2007.
- The Diary of a derelict Dairy, The Express Dairy Depot, Bloomsbury (prior to re-development), 20 June – 20 July 2008, part of the London Festival of Architecture. Weisz curated the exhibition of works upon the subject of buildings and their stories of Bloomsbury.
- Ubi sunt, 2011.

== Publications ==
Editor with Rizzoli International Publications:

- A Picture History of the Grenvilles of Rosedale House by Mary Yelloly. Lyndsey Stainton. Preface by Simon Finch, Helena Bonham-Carter. Designed and edited by Weisz, 2007.
- Narciso Rodriguez by Betsy Berne. Co-edited by Weisz, 2008.
- Norman Parkinson A Very British Glamour by Louise Baring. Designed by Lee Swillingham/Suburbia. Edited by Weisz, 2009.
- Matthew Williamson by Colin McDowell. Edited by Weisz, 2010.
- WKW: The Cinema of Wong Kar Wai by John Powers. Co-edited by Weisz, 2016.
