= R v Wang =

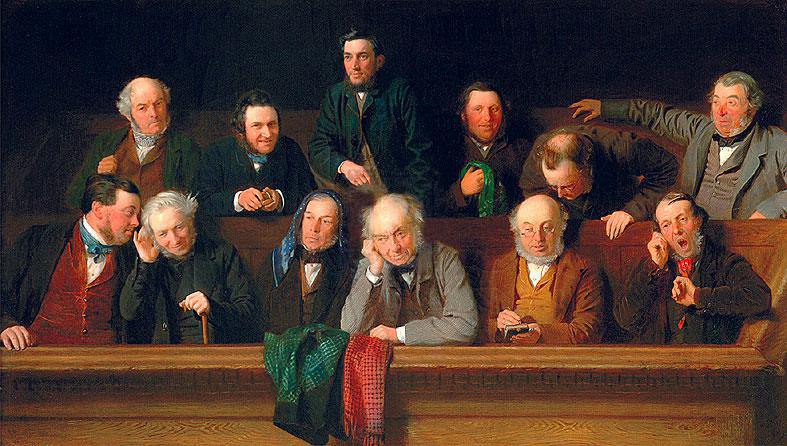
- Court: House of Lords
- Full case name: Her Majesty the Queen or Regina or the Crown (versus or and) Cheong Wang
- Decided: 10 February 2005
- Citations: R v Wang [2005] UKHL 9, [2005] 1 WLR 661, [2005] 1 All ER 782, [2005] 2 Cr App R 8

Case history
- Prior actions: R v Wang [2003] EWCA Crim 3228 (Laws LJ, Curtis J, Recorder of Cardiff)
- Appealed from: Court of Appeal of England and Wales (Criminal Division)
- Related actions: Court of Appeal re-formulating of ancillary orders, 18 July 2005, EWCA Crim 2073

Court membership
- Judges sitting: Lord Bingham of Cornhill, Lord Steyn, Lord Rodger of Earlsferry, Lord Walker of Gestingthorpe, Lord Carswell

Case opinions
- There are no circumstances in which a judge is entitled to direct a jury to return a verdict of guilty. The appeal was allowed and the conviction of the defendant was quashed.
- Decision by: Unanimous opinion of the whole committee, that is, per curiam

Keywords
- Jury instructions

R v Wang [2005] UKHL 9 is a decision of the House of Lords, acting as final court of criminal appeal of England and Wales. The defendant, Wang, had been convicted, on overwhelming evidence, by a jury after the judge directed them to return a verdict of guilty. The House of Lords found such a direction to be impermissible under any circumstances and quashed the conviction.

== Facts and trial ==
Mr Cheong Wang was a Chinese political asylum-seeker and a Buddhist, of the Shaolin Sect. On 27 February 2002 he was waiting for a train at Clacton-on-Sea railway station when his bag was stolen. He searched and found a thief with the bag, whom he attempted to detain, and from whom he recovered it. From this, he drew a curved martial-arts sword, with a sheath. In the ensuring altercation the local police was called in, and upon a further search of the bag by the police a small "Gurkha style knife" was found. For all these, he was indicted on two counts of having an article with a blade or point in a public place, contrary to section 139(1) of the Criminal Justice Act 1988, one relating to each weapon.

Wang was tried in the Crown Court at Chelmsford, also in Essex, before Judge Pearson, with a jury. The defence argued that he had a statutory defence that he was carrying the weapons for religious purposes (commonly relied on, for example, by Sikh men wearing the kirpan), but the judge rejected the defence and did not permit the jury to hear it. On 28 August 2002 he recalled the jury and directed them to return a verdict of guilty on each count, which they did. He was conditionally discharged on 4 October for a period of 12 months. Forfeiture orders were also made for the two offending articles.

== Appeal to the Court of Appeal ==
He appealed against his conviction to the Court of Appeal, and the appeal was heard before Laws LJ, Curtis J and the Recorder of Cardiff. They dismissed the appeal, concluding a judge was entitled to direct the jury to convict provided that "it is plain beyond sensible argument that the material before the jury could not in law suffice to discharge the burden" necessary to satisfy the defence.

== Appeal to the House of Lords ==
Wang appealed to the Judicial Committee of the House of Lords. In a unanimous opinion, the appellate committee allowed his appeal and quashed his conviction, concluding that "there are no circumstances in which a judge is entitled to direct a jury to return a verdict of guilty" because a "belief that the jury would probably, and rightly, have convicted does not [enable a trial judge to give a direction to convict] ... when there were matters which could and should have been the subject of their consideration".

== Significance ==
The judgment settled the law in England and Wales by providing a clear authority in this topic of uncertainty. The case caused the Criminal Cases Review Commission to refer the 1972 conviction of Edward Caley-Knowles to the Court of Appeal. Caley-Knowles's conviction was subsequently quashed based on the authority of Wang.
