= List of awards and nominations received by Rachel Weisz =

Rachel Weisz awards and nominations
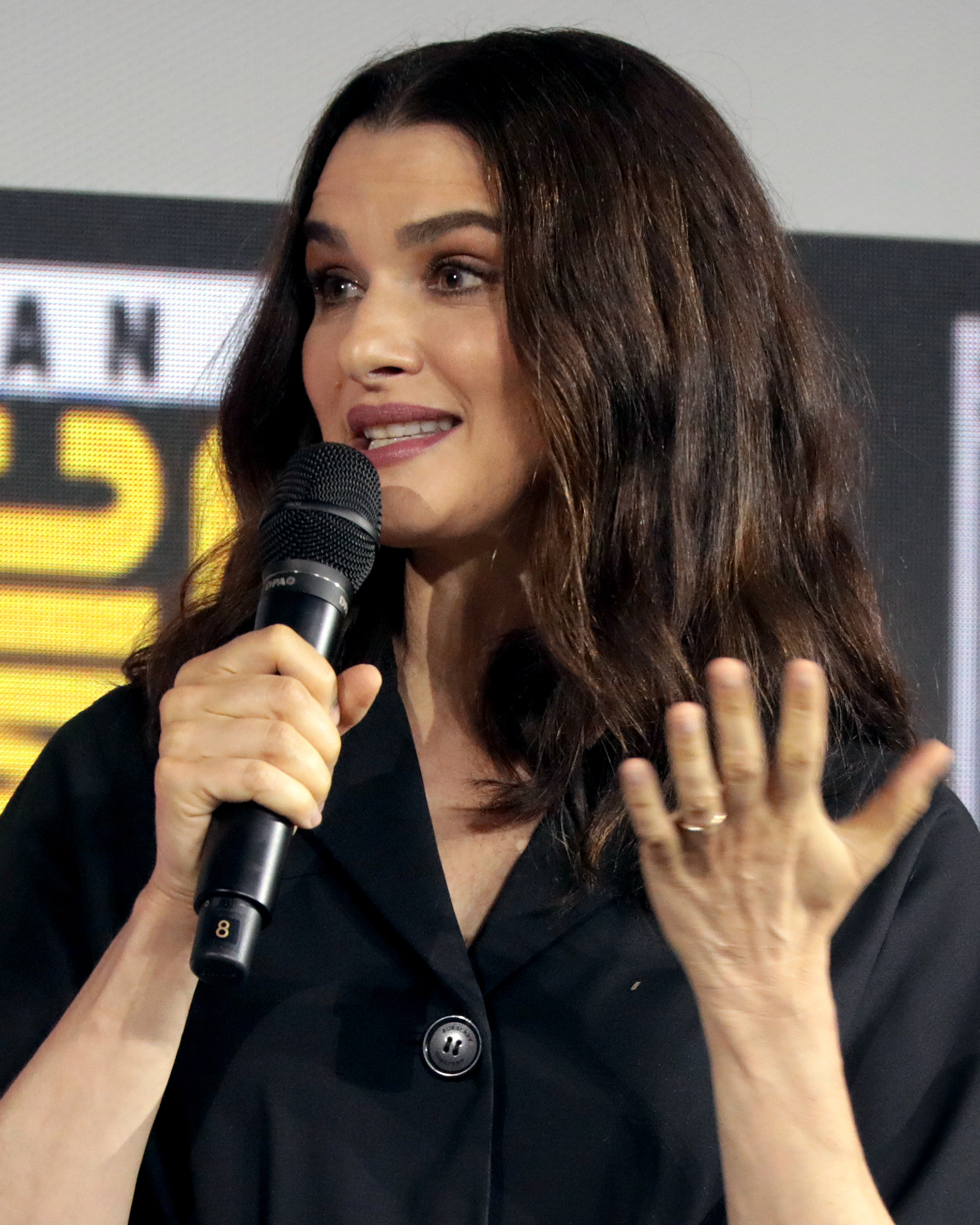
- Weisz at the 2019 San Diego Comic-Con
Awards and nominations
Award	Wins	Nominations
Academy Awards	1	2
BAFTA Awards	1	2
Golden Globes	1	4
SAG Awards	1	2
Olivier Awards	1	1

Totals (Note: Certain award groups do not simply award one winner. They acknowledge several different recipients, have runners-up, and have third place. Since this is a specific recognition and is different from losing an award, runner-up mentions are considered wins in this award tally. For simplification and to avoid errors, each award in this list has been presumed to have had a prior nomination.)
- Wins: 30
- Nominations: 118

Rachel Weisz is a British actress known for roles on the stage and screen. Over her career she has received several accolades including an Academy Award, a British Academy Film Award, a Golden Globe Award, a Screen Actors Guild Award and a Laurence Olivier Award.

She has received two Academy Award nominations winning Best Supporting Actress for her role in Fernando Meirelles The Constant Gardener (2005). She received her second Academy Award nomination for her performance in the Yorgos Lanthimos period comedy The Favourite (2019). Weisz also received a British Academy Film Award for Best Film Actress in a Supporting Role for her role in The Favourite. She has received three Golden Globe Award nominations and two Screen Actors Guild Award nominations winning both for The Constant Gardener (2005).

For her work in theatre, she received the Laurence Olivier Award for Best Actress in a Play for her leading performance as Blanche Dubois in the revival production of the Tennessee Williams' play A Streetcar Named Desire in 2010. Weisz made her Broadway debut in the revival of the Harold Pinter play Betrayal alongside her husband Daniel Craig in 2013.

== Major associations ==
=== Academy Awards ===
Year	Category	Nominated work	Result	Ref.
2006	Best Supporting Actress	The Constant Gardener	Won	
2019	Best Supporting Actress	The Favourite	Nominated	

=== BAFTA Awards ===
Year	Category	Nominated work	Result	Ref.
2006	Best Film Actress in a Leading Role	The Constant Gardener	Nominated	
2019	Best Film Actress in a Supporting Role	The Favourite	Won	

=== Critics' Choice Association Awards ===
Year	Category	Nominated work	Result	Ref.
2006	Best Movie Supporting Actress	The Constant Gardener	Nominated	
2019	Best Movie Supporting Actress	The Favourite	Nominated	
2019	Best Movie Cast	The Favourite	Won	

=== Golden Globe Awards ===
Year	Category	Nominated work	Result	Ref.
2006	Best Supporting Actress – Motion Picture	The Constant Gardener	Won	
2013	Best Actress in a Motion Picture – Drama	The Deep Blue Sea	Nominated	
2019	Best Supporting Actress – Motion Picture	The Favourite	Nominated	
2024	Best Actress in a Miniseries or Motion Picture – Television	Dead Ringers	Nominated	

=== Screen Actors Guild Awards ===
Year	Category	Nominated work	Result	Ref.
2006	Outstanding Performance by a Female Actor in a Supporting Role in a Motion Picture	The Constant Gardener	Won	
2019	Outstanding Performance by a Female Actor in a Supporting Role in a Motion Picture	The Favourite	Nominated	

=== Laurence Olivier Awards ===
Year	Category	Nominated work	Result	Ref.
2010	Best Actress	A Streetcar Named Desire	Won	

== Other Awards and Nominations ==
=== British Independent Film Awards ===
Year	Category	Nominated work	Result	Ref.
2005	Best Actress	The Constant Gardener	Won	
2018	Best Actress	Disobedience	Nominated	
2018	Best British Independent Film	Disobedience	Nominated	
2018	Best Supporting Actress	The Favourite	Won	

=== Empire Awards ===
Year	Category	Nominated work	Result	Ref.
2001	Best British Actress	The Mummy Returns	Nominated	

=== European Film Awards ===
Year	Category	Nominated work	Result	Ref.
2001	People's Choice Award for Best Actress	Enemy at the Gates	Nominated	
2015	Best Actress	Youth	Nominated	

=== Gotham Awards ===
Year	Category	Nominated work	Result	Ref.
2018	Special Award	Performer Tribute	Won	
2018	Best Ensemble Performance	The Favourite	Won	
2023	Breakthrough Series - Over 40 Minutes	Dead Ringers	Nominated	
2023	Outstanding Performance in a New Series	Dead Ringers	Nominated	

=== Goya Awards ===
Year	Category	Nominated work	Result	Ref.
2010	Best Actress	Agora	Nominated	

== Critics associations and other awards ==
Year	Nominated work	Organization	Category	Result	Ref.
2003	Central Ohio Film Critics Association	Best Actress	The Shape of Things	Nominated	
2005	London Film Critics' Circle	British Actress of the Year	The Constant Gardener	Won	
2005	Iowa Film Critics	Best Supporting Actress	The Constant Gardener	Won	
2005	North Texas Film Critics Association	Best Supporting Actress	The Constant Gardener	Won	
2005	San Diego Film Critics Society	Best Supporting Actress	The Constant Gardener	Won	
2005	St. Louis Film Critics Association	Best Supporting Actress	The Constant Gardener	Won	
2005	Utah Film Critics Association	Best Supporting Actress	The Constant Gardener	Won	
2005	Chicago Film Critics Association	Best Supporting Actress	The Constant Gardener	Nominated	
2005	Dallas-Fort Worth Film Critics Association	Best Supporting Actress	The Constant Gardener	Nominated	
2005	Online Film & Television Association	Best Supporting Actress	The Constant Gardener	Nominated	
2005	Vancouver Film Critics Circle	Best Supporting Actress	The Constant Gardener	Nominated	
2010	Vancouver Film Critics Circle	Best Actress in a Canadian Film	The Whistleblower	Nominated	
2011	New York Film Critics Circle	Best Actress	The Deep Blue Sea	Won	
2011	Toronto Film Critics Association	Best Actress	The Deep Blue Sea	Won	
2011	Village Voice Film Poll	Best Actress	The Deep Blue Sea	Won	
2011	London Film Critics' Circle	British Actress of the Year	The Deep Blue Sea	Nominated	
2011	Evening Standard British Film Awards	Best Actress	The Deep Blue Sea	Nominated	
2011	Indiewire Critics' Poll	Best Lead Performance	The Deep Blue Sea	Nominated	
2011	International Cinephile Society	Best Actress	The Deep Blue Sea	Nominated	
2011	Online Film Critics Society	Best Actress	The Deep Blue Sea	Nominated	
2015	Indiana Film Journalists Association	Best Supporting Actress	The Lobster	Nominated	
2016	Central Ohio Film Critics Association	Best Supporting Actress	The Light Between Oceans	Nominated	
2016	Evening Standard British Film Awards	Best Supporting Actress	The Light Between Oceans	Nominated	
2016	Indiana Film Journalists Association	Best Supporting Actress	The Light Between Oceans	Nominated	
2017	Evening Standard British Film Awards	Best Actress	My Cousin Rachel	Nominated	
2017	London Film Critics' Circle	British/Irish Actress of the Year	Disobedience	Nominated	
2017	Indiana Film Journalists Association	Best Actress	Disobedience	Nominated	
2017	National Film Awards UK	Best Actress	Disobedience	Nominated	
2017	National Film Awards UK	Best British Film	Disobedience	Nominated	
2017	Women Film Critics Circle	Best Screen Couple	Disobedience	Nominated	
2018	London Film Critics' Circle	Supporting Actress of the Year	The Favourite	Won	
2018	Denver Film Critics Society	Best Supporting Actress	The Favourite	Won	
2018	Florida Film Critics Circle	Best Ensemble	The Favourite	Won	
2018	Houston Film Critics Society	Best Supporting Actress	The Favourite	Won	
2018	Hollywood Film Awards	Supporting Actress of the Year	The Favourite	Won	
2018	Indiewire Critics' Poll	Best Supporting Actress	The Favourite	Won	
2018	International Cinephile Society	Best Supporting Actress	The Favourite	Won	
2018	Nevada Film Critics Society	Best Supporting Actress	The Favourite	Won	
2018	Online Film & Television Association	Best Ensemble	The Favourite	Won	
2018	Southeastern Film Critics Association	Best Ensemble	The Favourite	Won	
2018	Vancouver Film Critics Circle	Best Supporting Actress	The Favourite	Won	
2018	Southeastern Film Critics Association	Best Supporting Actress	The Favourite	Runner-up	
2018	Alliance of Women Film Journalists	Best Supporting Actress	The Favourite	Nominated	
2018	Austin Film Critics Association	Best Supporting Actress	The Favourite	Nominated	
2018	London Film Critics' Circle	British/Irish Actress of the Year	The Favourite	Nominated	
2018	Chicago Film Critics Association	Best Supporting Actress	The Favourite	Nominated	
2018	Chicago Independent Film Critics Circle	Best Supporting Actress	The Favourite	Nominated	
2018	Central Ohio Film Critics Association	Best Supporting Actress	The Favourite	Nominated	
2018	Detroit Film Critics Society	Best Supporting Actress	The Favourite	Nominated	
2018	Dorian Awards	Film Performance of the Year - Supporting Actress	The Favourite	Nominated	
2018	Dallas–Fort Worth Film Critics Association	Best Supporting Actress	The Favourite	Nominated	
2018	Florida Film Critics Circle	Best Supporting Actress	The Favourite	Nominated	
2018	Georgia Film Critics Association	Best Supporting Actress	The Favourite	Nominated	
2018	Greater Western New York Film Critics Association	Best Supporting Actress	The Favourite	Nominated	
2018	Hawai Film Critics Society	Best Supporting Actress	The Favourite	Nominated	
2018	Iowa Film Critics	Best Supporting Actress	The Favourite	Nominated	
2018	Indiana Film Journalists Association	Best Actress	The Favourite	Nominated	
2018	Latino Entertainment Journalists Association	Best Performance by an Actress in a Supporting Role	The Favourite	Nominated	
2018	North Carolina Film Critics Association	Best Supporting Actress	The Favourite	Nominated	
2018	North Texas Film Critics Association	Best Supporting Actress	The Favourite	Nominated	
2018	Online Film Critics Society	Best Supporting Actress	The Favourite	Nominated	
2018	Online Film & Television Association	Best Supporting Actress	The Favourite	Nominated	
2018	Phoenix Critics Circle	Best Supporting Actress	The Favourite	Nominated	
2018	Seattle Film Critics Society	Best Supporting Actress	The Favourite	Nominated	
2018	San Francisco Film Critics Circle	Best Supporting Actress	The Favourite	Nominated	
2018	St. Louis Film Critics Association	Best Supporting Actress	The Favourite	Nominated	
2018	Toronto Film Critics Association	Best Supporting Actress	The Favourite	Nominated	
2018	Washington DC Area Film Critics Association	Best Supporting Actress	The Favourite	Nominated	
2018	Women Film Critics Circle	Women's Work/Best Ensemble	The Favourite	Nominated	
