= Rachel Weisz =

British actress (born 1970)

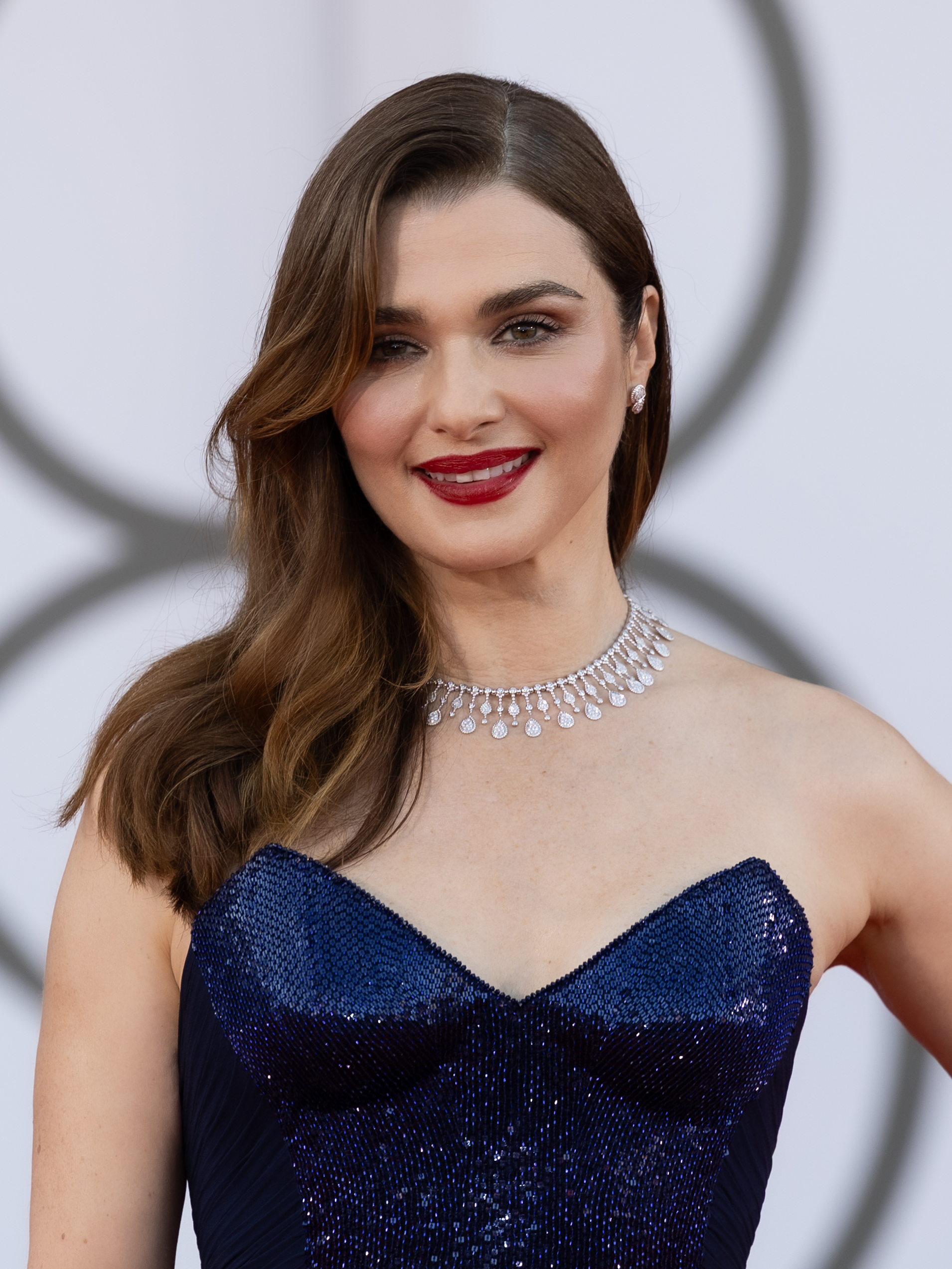
- Weisz at the 2024 Venice Film Festival
- Born: Rachel Hannah Weisz; 7 March 1970 (age 56); London, England
- Citizenship: United Kingdom; United States
- Education: University of Cambridge
- Occupations: Actress; producer
- Years active: 1992–present
- Spouse: Daniel Craig (m. 2011)
- Partner: Darren Aronofsky (2001–2010)
- Children: 2
- Relatives: Minnie Weisz (sister)
- Awards: Full list

Rachel Hannah Weisz (/vaɪs/; born 7 March 1970) (Note: There are conflicting sources for the year of Weisz' birth. The database entry of the British Film Institute, citing London birth records gives a year of 1970, as does the Encyclopædia Britannica and the National Portrait Gallery. However, some older sources give it as 1971, including her detailed biography at the British Film Institute and a biographic article in The Guardian. The Evening Standard in 2006 claimed that Weisz herself gave 1971 as her year of birth.) is a British actress. Known for her performances on stage and screen, she has received several awards, including an Academy Award, an Actor Award, a BAFTA Award, a Golden Globe Award, and a Laurence Olivier Award.

Weisz began acting in stage and television productions in the early 1990s, and made her film debut in Death Machine (1994). She won a Critics' Circle Theatre Award for her role in the 1994 revival of Noël Coward's play Design for Living, and went on to appear in the 1999 Donmar Warehouse production of Tennessee Williams' drama Suddenly Last Summer. Her film breakthrough came with her starring role as Evelyn Carnahan in the Hollywood action films The Mummy (1999) and The Mummy Returns (2001). Weisz went on to star in several films of the 2000s, including Enemy at the Gates (2001), About a Boy (2002), Runaway Jury (2003), Constantine (2005), The Fountain (2006), Definitely, Maybe (2008), The Lovely Bones (2009) and The Whistleblower (2010).

For her performance as an activist in the 2005 thriller The Constant Gardener, she won the Academy Award for Best Supporting Actress, and for playing Blanche DuBois in a 2009 revival of A Streetcar Named Desire, she won the Laurence Olivier Award for Best Actress. In the 2010s, Weisz continued to star in big-budget films such as the action film The Bourne Legacy (2012) and the fantasy film Oz the Great and Powerful (2013) and achieved critical acclaim for her performances in the independent films The Deep Blue Sea (2011), Denial (2016), and The Favourite (2018). For her portrayal of Sarah Churchill in The Favourite, she won the BAFTA Award for Best Actress in a Supporting Role and received a second Academy Award nomination. Weisz portrayed Melina Vostokoff in the Marvel Cinematic Universe film Black Widow (2021) and starred as twin obstetricians in the thriller miniseries Dead Ringers (2023).

== Early life ==
Weisz was born on 7 March 1970 in Westminster, London, and grew up in Hampstead Garden Suburb. In 1938, before WW2, her parents as children had come to the UK to escape the Nazis. Her father, George Weisz, was a Hungarian Jewish mechanical engineer and inventor known for pioneering a type of ventilator. Her mother, Edith Ruth (née Teich), was a teacher, and later a psychotherapist, originally from Vienna, Austria. Her maternal grandfather's ancestry was Austrian Jewish; her maternal grandmother was Catholic and of Italian ancestry. The scholar and social activist James Parkes helped her mother's family to leave Austria for England. Weisz's mother was raised in the Catholic church and formally converted to Judaism upon marrying Weisz's father. Weisz's maternal grandfather was Alexander Teich, a Jewish activist who had been a secretary of the World Union of Jewish Students.

Her younger sister Minnie Weisz is a visual artist. Weisz's parents valued the arts; they encouraged their children to form opinions of their own by engaging their participation in family debates. Weisz left North London Collegiate School and attended Benenden School for one year, completing her A-levels at St Paul's Girls School.

Known for being an "English rose", Weisz began modelling at the age of 14. In 1984, she gained public attention when she turned down an offer to star in King David with Richard Gere.

In 1988, Weisz went up to Trinity Hall, Cambridge, taking a 2:1 in English. At Cambridge, she was a contemporary of Sacha Baron Cohen, Alexander Armstrong, Emily Maitlis, Sue Perkins, Mel Giedroyc, Richard Osman and Ben Miller (whom she dated briefly). She appeared in student plays, co-founding an all-female student drama group Cambridge Talking Tongues. The group won a Guardian Student Drama Award at the 1991 Edinburgh Festival Fringe for an improvised two-woman–show piece written by Weisz herself called Slight Possession, directed by David Farr.

Weisz then trained under master clown Philippe Gaulier at École Philippe Gaulier.

== Career ==
=== 1990s ===
In 1992, Weisz appeared in the television film Advocates II, followed by roles in the Inspector Morse episode "Twilight of the Gods", and the BBC's steamy period drama Scarlet and Black, alongside Ewan McGregor. Dirty Something, a BBC Screen Two, hour-long television film made in 1992, was Weisz's first film.

Weisz's breakthrough role on the stage was that of Gilda in Sean Mathias's 1994 revival of Noël Coward's Design for Living at the Gielgud Theatre, for which she received the London Critics' Circle Award for the most promising newcomer. Her portrayal was described as "wonderful" by a contemporary review.

Weisz started her film career with a minor role in the 1994 film Death Machine; her first major role came in the 1996 film Chain Reaction. The film received mostly negative reviews—it holds a 16% rating on Rotten Tomatoes and was a minor financial success. She next appeared as Miranda Fox in Stealing Beauty, directed by Bernardo Bertolucci, where she was first labelled an "English rose".

Weisz found roles in the 1997 American drama Swept from the Sea, the 1998 British television comedy-drama My Summer with Des, Michael Winterbottom's crime film I Want You, and David Leland's The Land Girls, based on Angela Huth's book of the same name.

In 1999, Weisz played Greta in the historical film Sunshine. The same year, her international breakthrough came with the 1999 adventure film The Mummy, in which she played the female lead opposite Brendan Fraser. Her character, Evelyn Carnahan, is an English Egyptologist, who undertakes an expedition to the fictional ancient Egyptian city of Hamunaptra to discover an ancient book. Variety criticised the direction of the film, writing: "(the actors) have been directed to broad, undisciplined performances [...] Buffoonery hardly seems like Weisz's natural domain, as the actress strains for comic effects that she can't achieve". She followed this up with the sequel The Mummy Returns in 2001, which grossed an estimated $433 million worldwide, (equivalent to $787 million in 2025 dollars) higher than the original's $260 million (equal to $502 million in 2025 dollars).

Also in 1999, she played the role of Catherine in the Donmar Warehouse production of Tennessee Williams' Suddenly Last Summer, What's on Stage called her "captivating", stating that she brought "a degree of credibility to a difficult part". In 2001, Weisz appeared in Neil LaBute's The Shape of Things at the Almeida Theatre, then temporarily located in London's King's Cross, for which she received a Theatre World Award. CurtainUp called her "a sophisticated, independent artist" with "great stage presence".

=== 2000s ===
In 2000, she portrayed Petula in the film Beautiful Creatures, followed by her portrayal of Tania Chernova in 2001's Enemy at the Gates, and the 2002 comedy-drama About a Boy, with Hugh Grant, based on Nick Hornby's 1998 novel. In 2003, she played Marlee in the adaptation of John Grisham's legal thriller novel The Runaway Jury; and starred in the film adaptation of the romantic comedy-drama play The Shape of Things.

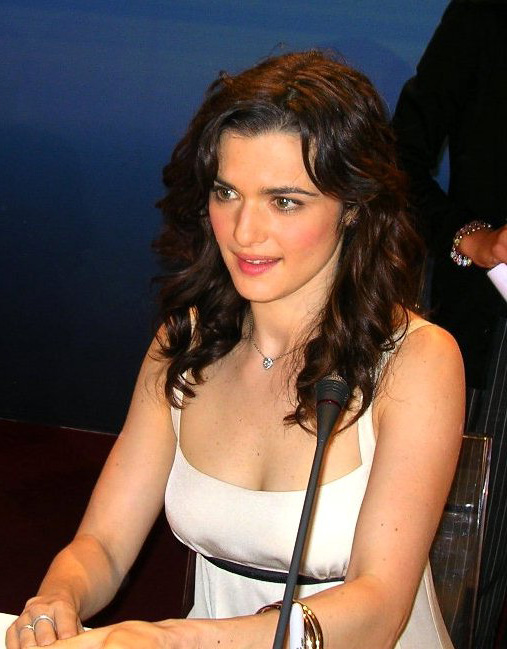
Weisz in 2007

In 2004, Weisz appeared in the comedy Envy. The film failed at the box office. Variety opined that Weisz and co-star Amy Poehler "get fewer choice moments than they deserve." Her next role was alongside Keanu Reeves in Constantine, based on the comic book Hellblazer. Film Threat called her portrayal "effective at projecting scepticism and, eventually, dawning horror".

Her next appearance, in 2005, was in Fernando Meirelles's The Constant Gardener, a film adaptation of a John le Carré thriller set in the slums of Kibera and Loiyangalani, Kenya. Weisz played an activist, Tessa Quayle, married to a British embassy official. The film was critically acclaimed, earning Weisz the Academy Award for Best Supporting Actress, the Golden Globe Award for Best Supporting Actress, and the Screen Actors Guild Award for Outstanding Performance by a Female Actor in a Supporting Role. UK newspaper The Guardian noted that the film "established her in the front rank of British actors", while the BBC wrote: "Weisz is exceptional: film star charisma coupled with raw emotion in a performance to fall in love with". In 2006, she received the BAFTA Britannia Award for British Artist of the Year.

In 2006, Weisz starred in American filmmaker Darren Aronofsky's romantic drama The Fountain. The San Francisco Chronicle found her portrayal of Queen Isabel "less convincing" than other roles. That same year, she provided the voice for Saphira the dragon in the fantasy film Eragon; and rejected an offer to star in The Mummy: Tomb of the Dragon Emperor due to script issues. The part eventually went to Maria Bello. Her subsequent films include the 2007 Wong Kar-wai drama My Blueberry Nights, and Rian Johnson's 2008 caper film The Brothers Bloom. In 2009, she played the lead role of Hypatia of Alexandria in the historical drama film Agora, a Spanish production directed by Alejandro Amenábar. The New York Times called her portrayal "adept", noting that she imparted "a sympathetic presence". That same year, she appeared as Blanche DuBois, in Rob Ashford's revival of the play A Streetcar Named Desire. Her performance in the play was praised by critics, the Daily Telegraph noted that she "rises to the challenge magnificently".

=== 2010s ===
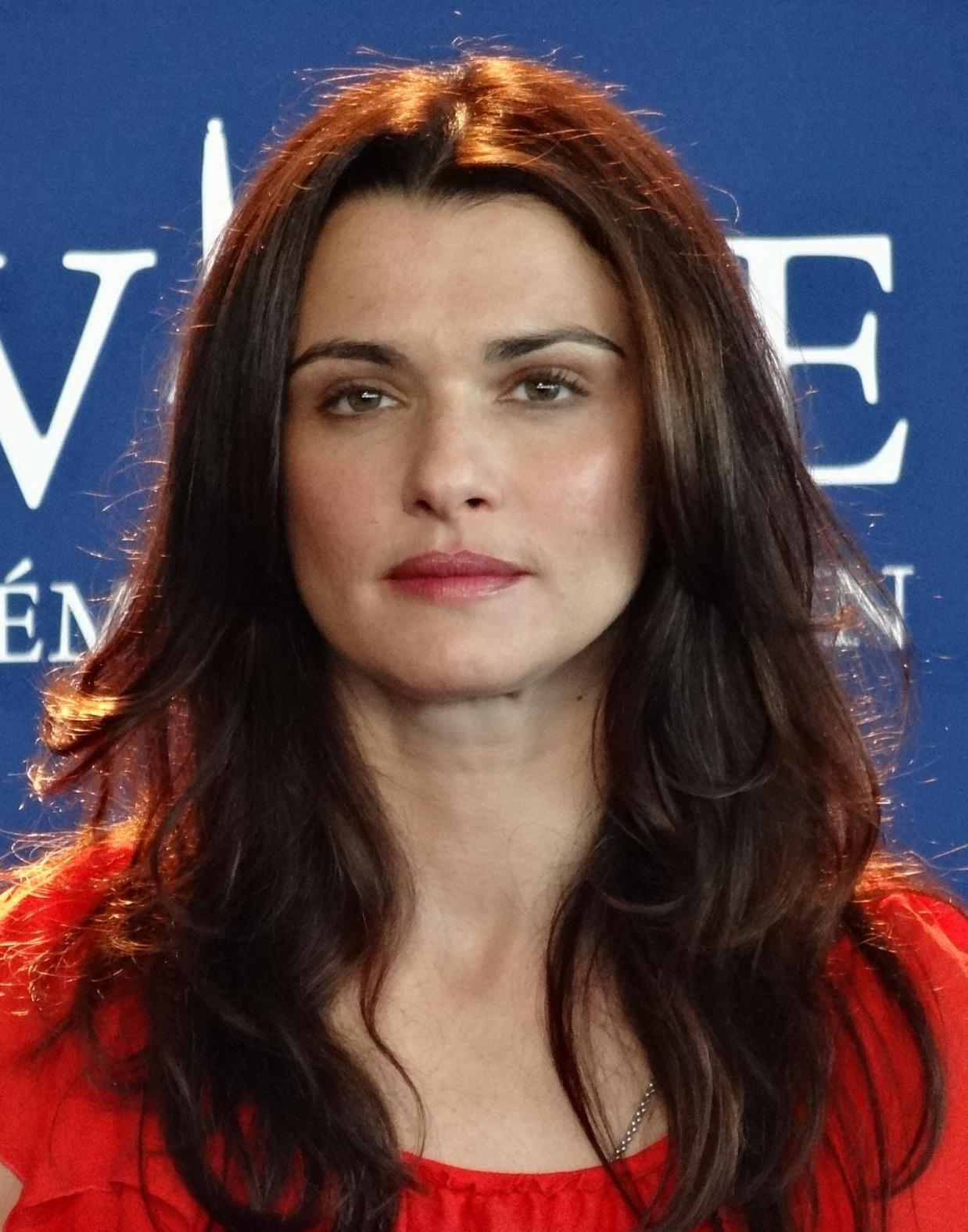
Weisz at the 2012 Deauville American Film Festival

Weisz starred in the film The Whistleblower, which debuted at the Toronto International Film Festival in 2010. The film was based on the true story of human trafficking by employees of contractor DynCorp. During its première, the intense depiction of the treatment meted out to victims by the kidnappers made a woman in the audience faint. Variety wrote "Weisz's performance holds the viewer every step of the way." That same year, she guest-starred in the animated series The Simpsons, in the 22nd season episode "How Munched is That Birdie in the Window?". Weisz's 2011 roles included an adaptation of Terence Rattigan's play The Deep Blue Sea, Fernando Meirelles' drama 360, the BBC espionage thriller Page Eight, and the thriller film Dream House.

She filmed scenes for To the Wonder, a 2012 romantic drama film written and directed by Terrence Malick; her scenes were cut. She has starred in the 2012 action thriller film The Bourne Legacy based on the series of books by Robert Ludlum.

In 2013, Weisz starred on Broadway alongside her husband, Daniel Craig, in a revival of Harold Pinter's Betrayal. It opened 27 October 2013, and closed 5 January 2014. Box office receipts of $17.5 million made it the second highest grossing Broadway play of 2013. That year, Weisz played Evanora in the fantasy film Oz the Great and Powerful.

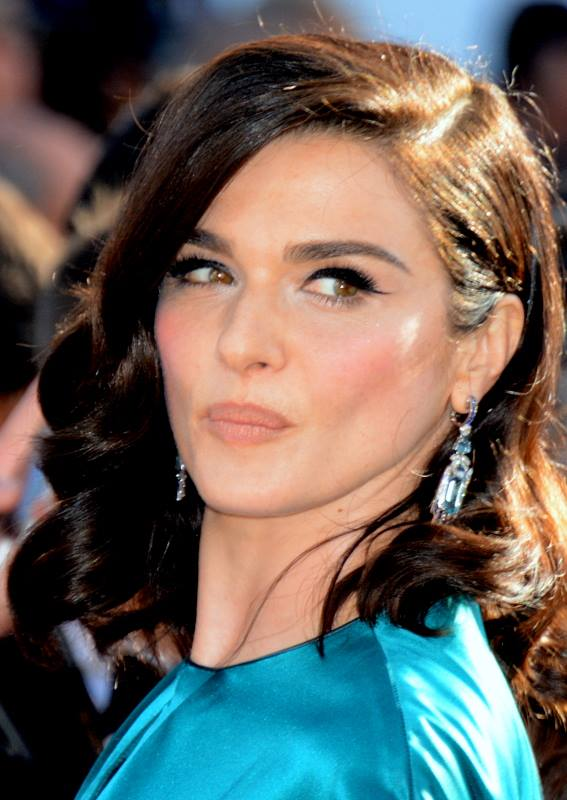
Weisz at the 2015 Cannes Film Festival

In 2015, she appeared in drama film Youth and in science fiction film The Lobster. Lobster won the Cannes Jury Prize. In 2016, she appeared in the drama film The Light Between Oceans, and portrayed Holocaust historian Deborah Lipstadt in Denial, a film based on Lipstadt's book, and directed by Mick Jackson.

In 2017, Weisz starred in My Cousin Rachel, a drama based on Daphne du Maurier's novel, and in 2018 co-starred in a British biographical film about sailor Donald Crowhurst, The Mercy, directed by James Marsh.

Weisz's production company, LC6 Productions, released its first feature film, Disobedience, in 2017, starring Weisz and Rachel McAdams. Weisz grew up three London Underground stops away from the Orthodox Jewish neighborhood where the film is set. Raised within Judaism, Weisz never fully connected to her ancestral religion. She claims she was "really disobedient" herself and has never felt she fits in anywhere.

In 2018, Weisz played the cutthroat advisor Lady Sarah Churchill in The Favourite, winning the BAFTA Award for Best Actress in a Supporting Role and nominated for the Screen Actors Guild Award, Golden Globe Award, the Critics' Choice Award, and the Academy Award.

=== 2020s ===
In April 2019, Weisz entered talks to join Scarlett Johansson in the Marvel Cinematic Universe film Black Widow. In July of that year, Weisz was announced to play Melina Vostokoff in the film, which was released on 9 July 2021.

In 2023, Weisz starred in and executive produced the Prime Video miniseries remake Dead Ringers, earning a nomination for the Golden Globe Award for Best Actress – Miniseries or Television Film. She later starred as the lead in the 2026 Netflix limited series Vladimir, an adaptation of Julia May Jonas’s novel. Weisz has been cast in Tomas Alfredson’s upcoming drama Séance on a Wet Afternoon opposite Matthew Macfadyen and Joe Alwyn. She has also been announced to reprise her role as Evelyn O’Connell in the fourth installment of the Mummy franchise, reuniting with Brendan Fraser and John Hannah; the film is being developed by Radio Silence Productions and is scheduled for release in 2028.

== Other activities ==
In 2006, Burberry's creative director Christopher Bailey chose Weisz for an advertising campaign photographed by Mario Testino; she later did another campaign for the brand in 2023. She was named L'Oréal's global ambassador in 2010. In 2011, she fronted the advertising campaign for Bulgari's Jasmin Noir fragrance.

== Personal life ==
In 2001, Weisz began dating filmmaker and producer Darren Aronofsky. They met backstage at London's Almeida Theatre, where she was starring in The Shape of Things. Weisz moved to New York City with Aronofsky the following year; in 2005, they were engaged. Their son was born in May 2006 in New York City. The couple lived in the East Village in Manhattan. Mohel Philip Sherman performed their son's brit milah (bris). In November 2010, Weisz and Aronofsky announced that they had been apart for months but remained close friends and were committed to bringing up their son together in New York.

Weisz and the English actor Daniel Craig were friends for many years and worked together on the 2011 film Dream House. They began dating in December 2010 and married on 22 June 2011 in a private New York ceremony, with four guests in attendance, including Weisz's son and Craig's daughter. On 1 September 2018, it was reported that they had their first child together, a daughter.

Weisz has been featured on the covers of magazines such as Vogue. She served as a muse to the fashion designer Narciso Rodriguez. Weisz learned karate for her role in The Brothers Bloom. A British citizen by birth, Weisz became a naturalised American citizen in 2011.

== Acting credits ==
=== Film ===
Year	Title	Role	Notes
1994	Death Machine	Junior Executive	
1994	White Goods	Elaine	
1996	Chain Reaction	Dr. Lily Sinclair	
1996	Stealing Beauty	Miranda Fox	
1997	Bent	Prostitute	
1997	Going All the Way	Marty Pilcher	
1997	Swept from the Sea	Amy Foster	
1998	I Want You	Helen	
1998	The Land Girls	Agapanthus	
1999	The Mummy	Evelyn Carnahan	
1999	Sunshine	Greta Sors	
1999	Tube Tales	Angela	Segment: Rosebud
2000	Beautiful Creatures	Petula	
2001	Enemy at the Gates	Tania Chernova	
2001	The Mummy Returns	Evelyn Carnahan / Nefertiri	
2002	About a Boy	Rachel	
2003	Confidence	Lily	
2003	The Shape of Things	Evelyn Ann Thompson	Also producer
2003	Runaway Jury	Marlee	
2004	Envy	Debbie Dingman	
2005	Constantine	Angela and Isabel Dodson	
2005	The Constant Gardener	Tessa Quayle	
2006	The Fountain	Queen Isabel / Izzi Creo	
2006	Eragon	Saphira (voice)	
2007	Fred Claus	Wanda	
2007	My Blueberry Nights	Sue Lynne	
2008	Definitely, Maybe	Summer Hartley	
2008	The Brothers Bloom	Penelope	
2009	The Lovely Bones	Abigail Salmon	
2009	Agora	Hypatia	
2010	The Whistleblower	Kathryn Bolkovac	
2011	360	Rose	
2011	Dream House	Libby Atenton	
2011	The Deep Blue Sea	Hester Collyer	
2012	The Bourne Legacy	Dr. Marta Shearing	
2012	To the Wonder	Dinah	Scenes deleted
2013	Oz the Great and Powerful	Evanora	
2015	The Lobster	Short Sighted Woman	
2015	Youth	Lena Ballinger	
2016	Complete Unknown	Alice Manning	
2016	The Light Between Oceans	Hannah Potts Roennfeldt	
2016	Denial	Deborah Lipstadt	
2017	My Cousin Rachel	Rachel Ashley	
2017	Disobedience	Ronit Krushka	Also producer
2017	The Mercy	Clare Crowhurst	
2018	The Favourite	Sarah Churchill	
2021	Black Widow	Melina Vostokoff	
2027	The Mummy: Book of the Dead †	Evelyn Carnahan	Filming
TBA	Séance on a Wet Afternoon †	Myra Savage	Post-production; also producer

Key
†	Denotes films that have not yet been released

=== Television ===
Year	Title	Role	Notes
1992	Advocates II	Sarah Thompson	Television film
1993	Inspector Morse	Arabella Baydon	Episode: "Twilight of the Gods"
1993	Tropical Heat	Joey	Episode: "His Pal Joey"
1993	Scarlet and Black	Mathilde	TV miniseries
1994	Seventeen		TV short
1994	Screen Two	Becca	Episode: "Dirtysomething"
1998	My Summer with Des	Rosie	Television film
2000	This Is Not an Exit: The Fictional World of Bret Easton Ellis	Lauren Hynde	Television program
2010	The Simpsons	Dr. Thurston (voice)	Episode: "How Munched Is That Birdie in the Window?"
2011	Page Eight	Nancy Pierpan	Television film
2023	Dead Ringers	Elliot and Beverly Mantle	Lead role; also executive producer
2023	What If...?	Melina Vostokoff (voice)	Episode: "What If... Captain Carter Fought the Hydra Stomper?"
2026	Vladimir	M	8 episodes; also executive producer

=== Theatre ===
Year	Play	Role	Theatre
1994	Design for Living	Gilda	Gielgud Theatre
1999	Suddenly Last Summer	Catherine	Donmar Warehouse
1999	The Shape of Things	Evelyn Ann Thompson	Almeida Theatre
2001	The Shape of Things	Evelyn Ann Thompson	Promenade Theatre
2009	A Streetcar Named Desire	Blanche DuBois	Donmar Warehouse
2013	Betrayal	Emma	Ethel Barrymore Theatre
2016	Plenty	Susan Traherne	The Public Theater

== See also ==
- List of Academy Award winners and nominees from Great Britain
- List of Jewish Academy Award winners and nominees
- List of actors with more than one Academy Award nomination in the acting categories
