= Runaway Jury =

2003 American legal thriller film by Gary Fleder

- Theatrical release poster
- Directed by: Gary Fleder
- Screenplay by: Brian Koppelman; David Levien; Rick Cleveland; Matthew Chapman
- Based on: The Runaway Jury by John Grisham
- Produced by: Gary Fleder; Christopher Mankiewicz; Arnon Milchan
- Starring: John Cusack; Gene Hackman; Dustin Hoffman; Rachel Weisz; Bruce Davison; Bruce McGill; Jeremy Piven; Nick Searcy
- Cinematography: Robert Elswit
- Edited by: William Steinkamp; Jeff Williams
- Music by: Christopher Young
- Production companies: Regency Enterprises; New Regency
- Distributed by: 20th Century Fox
- Release date: October 17, 2003
- Running time: 127 minutes
- Country: United States
- Language: English
- Budget: $60 million
- Box office: $80.2 million

Runaway Jury is a 2003 American legal thriller film directed by Gary Fleder and starring John Cusack, Gene Hackman, Dustin Hoffman and Rachel Weisz. An adaptation of John Grisham's 1996 novel The Runaway Jury, the film pits lawyer Wendell Rohr (Hoffman) against shady jury consultant Rankin Fitch (Hackman), who uses unlawful means to stack the jury with people sympathetic to the defense. Meanwhile, a high-stakes cat-and-mouse game begins when juror Nicholas Easter (Cusack) and his girlfriend Marlee (Weisz) appear to be able to sway the jury to deliver any verdict they want in a trial against a gun manufacturer.

The film was released on October 17, 2003, by 20th Century Fox. It received generally positive reviews from critics, but underperformed at the box office, grossing $80.2 million worldwide against a $60 million budget. It is Hackman's penultimate film.

== Plot ==
In New Orleans, an ex-employee perpetrates a mass shooting with a machine pistol at a stock brokerage firm. Eleven people are killed and several others wounded in the incident. Among the dead is Jacob Wood. Two years later, with attorney Wendell Rohr, Jacob's widow Celeste Wood takes Vicksburg Firearms to court on the grounds that the company's gross negligence led to her husband's death. During jury selection (voir dire), jury consultant Rankin Fitch and his team communicate background information on each of the jurors through electronic surveillance to defense attorney Durwood Cable.

In the jury pool, Nick Easter attempts to get himself excused. Judge Frederick Harkin refuses, claiming he's giving him a lesson in civic duty, and Fitch tells Cable that the judge has now given them no choice but to select Nick as a juror. Nick's congenial manner wins over his fellow jurors, but Frank Herrera, a Marine veteran, takes an instant dislike to him.

Nick's girlfriend, Marlee makes an offer to Fitch and Rohr by phone: she will deliver the desired verdict to the first bidder. Rohr dismisses the offer, assuming it to be a tactic by Fitch to obtain a mistrial. Fitch asks for proof that she can deliver, though, which she provides by asking if he "feels patriotic". Nick then steers the jury toward a patriotic gesture, with a juror suggesting that they recite the Pledge of Allegiance. By observing the jurors' behaviour through concealed cameras, Fitch identifies Nick as the influencer and orders his apartment to be searched, but finds nothing. Nick interrupts the intruder, leading to a fight and foot chase, but the man escapes.

Marlee retaliates by getting one of Fitch's jurors bounced. Fitch then blackmails three jurors, one of whom, Rikki Coleman, attempts suicide. He also sends his men to find a concealed storage device in Nick's apartment with key information, after which they set fire to it. Nick shows the judge video footage of the earlier break-in, and the judge orders the jury sequestered.

Rohr's key witness, a former Vicksburg employee, doesn't show up. After confronting Fitch, Rohr decides that he cannot win the case. He asks his firm's partners for $10 million to pay Marlee. Fitch sends an operative, Janovich, to kidnap Marlee, but she fights him off and raises the price to $15 million. On principle, Rohr changes his mind and refuses to pay. After the CEO of Vicksburg Firearms loses his temper under cross-examination as a witness and makes a bad impression on the jury, Fitch agrees to pay Marlee to be certain of the verdict.

Fitch's subordinate Doyle, who is investigating Nick, finds that Nick is, in fact, Jeff Kerr, a law school drop-out. He then travels to Gardner, Indiana, where Jeff and his law school girlfriend Gabby (i.e., Marlee) both come from. Doyle gently quizzes Gabby's mother, who reveals that Gabby's sister died in a shooting years ago when she was in high school. At the time, the town of Gardner sued the manufacturer of the guns used and lost; Fitch had helped the defense win the case. Doyle concludes that Nick and Marlee's offer is a set-up, and he calls Fitch, but it is too late as the money has already been paid.

After Nick receives confirmation of the payment, he asks the other jurors to review the facts, saying they owe it to Celeste to deliberate. This causes Herrera to launch into a rant against the plaintiff, which undermines any support he had from the other jurors. The gun manufacturer is found liable, with the jury awarding $110 million in general damages to Celeste.

After the trial, Nick and Marlee confront Fitch with a receipt for the $15 million bribe, which they threaten to make public unless he retires. Fitch asks Nick how he got the jury to vote for the plaintiff; Nick replies that he didn't, explaining that he stopped Fitch from stealing the trial merely by getting the jury to vote with their hearts. Nick and Marlee inform an indignant Fitch that the $15 million "fee" will benefit the shooting victims in Gardner.

== Cast ==
- John Cusack as Nick Easter
- Gene Hackman as Rankin Fitch
- Dustin Hoffman as Wendell Rohr
- Rachel Weisz as Marlee
- Bruce Davison as Cable
- Bruce McGill as Judge Frederick Harkin
- Jeremy Piven as Lawrence Greene
- Nick Searcy as Doyle
- Stanley Anderson as Henry Jankle
- Cliff Curtis as Frank Herrera
- Nestor Serrano as Janovich
- Leland Orser as Lamb
- Jennifer Beals as Vanessa Lembeck
- Gerry Bamman as Herman Grimes
- Joanna Going as Celeste Wood
- Bill Nunn as Lonnie Shaver
- Juanita Jennings as Loreen Duke
- Marguerite Moreau as Amanda Monroe
- Nora Dunn as Stella Hulic
- Guy Torry as Eddie Weese
- Rusty Schwimmer as Millie Dupree
- Carol Sutton as Lou Dell

In addition, Dylan McDermott has an uncredited cameo as Jacob Wood, whose murder sets the plot in motion.

== Production ==
The rights to make an adaptation of John Grisham's 1996 novel The Runaway Jury, were purchased in August 1996 by Arnon Milchan and distribution partner Warner Bros. for a record $8 million, including first-look rights to Grisham's next novel. Joel Schumacher had been attached to direct with Edward Norton, Gwyneth Paltrow and Sean Connery to star. However, Schumacher dropped out in July 1997, with the cast members following suit. Philip Kaufman entered talks to direct shortly after, though was never formally attached. Alfonso Cuarón signed on to direct in September 1999. Due to the Tobacco Master Settlement Agreement and the similar premise of the film The Insider, Cuarón and Grisham worked with the studio to make the plaintiff sue a gun company rather than a tobacco company as originally intended. In 2001, Mike Newell was considered to direct with Will Smith to star, but a deal was unable to be met.

In March 2002, Gary Fleder was brought on to direct and produce. One month later, John Cusack was cast in the lead. Gene Hackman and Dustin Hoffman joined in May. While Naomi Watts had been considered for the female lead, she did not commit and Rachel Weisz signed on in June. Production began on September 16, 2002, in New Orleans.

== Reception ==
=== Box office ===
Runaway Jury grossed $49.4 million domestically (United States and Canada) and $30.7 million in other territories, for a worldwide total of $80.2 million, against a budget of $60 million. It opened at No. 3, in its first of four consecutive weeks in the Top 10 at the domestic box office.

=== Critical response ===
On the review aggregator website Rotten Tomatoes, 73% of 161 critics' reviews are positive, with an average rating of 6.6/10. The website's consensus reads: "An implausible but entertaining legal thriller." Metacritic, which uses a weighted average, assigned the film a score of 61 out of 100, based on 38 critics, indicating "generally favorable" reviews. Audiences polled by CinemaScore gave the film an average grade of "A-" on an A+ to F scale.

Roger Ebert of the Chicago Sun-Times gave the film three stars out of four, and stated that the plot to sell the jury to the highest-bidding party was the most ingenious device in the story, because it avoided pitting the "evil" and the "good" protagonists directly against each other in a stereotypical manner, but it plunged both of them into a moral abyss.
