= Jury research =

Jury or juror research is an umbrella term for the use of research methods in an attempt to gain some understanding of the juror experience in the courtroom and how jurors individually and collectively come to a determination about the guilt or otherwise of the accused.

== Brief history ==
Historically, juries have played a significant role in the determination of issues that could not be managed via 'general social interactions' or ones which required punitive measures, retribution and/or compensation. The role of jurors and juries however, has changed over the centuries and have generally been moulded by social and cultural forces embedded in the wider communities in which they have evolved. "Although the role of juries and jurors has a somewhat chequered history, 'the jury, in one form or the other, became the formal method of proof of the guilt or [otherwise] of a person on trial'", and juries remain one of the 'cornerstones' of the criminal justice system in many countries.

There are however, many debates about the efficacy of the jury system and the ability of jurors to adequately determine the guilt or otherwise of the accused. Some argue that lay individuals are incapable of digesting the often complex forensic evidence presented during a trial, others argue that any misunderstanding of the evidence is a flaw in legal cross examination and summing up. Many observe that the juror and the accused seldom can be considered 'peers' which is historically considered a fundamental precept of jury makeup. Others consider the jury system to be inherently flawed as a result of the humanity of jurors. They cite incidents in which the Judiciary have become aware of Juror assumptions made in the absence of supporting evidence, the unidentified effect on Jurors of stereotyping, culture, gender, age, education etc., which can and have influenced their ability to make a decision from an objective stance. These arguments and debates are founded in legal and psychological practice and made by social scientists and legal practitioners,

The juror however has a very personal and different perspective. The role played by the juror is an extraordinary one which is distinctive with minimal resemblance to their 'normal daily experiences/activities'. In effect the juror is plucked from their life, sometimes for considerable periods of time, they are deposited into an environment about which they generally have little knowledge or ability to negotiate, the language and behaviours of which are foreign and they are expected to make sense of their internal and external environments. As a result of their jury experience, many in Australia and New Zealand have reported feeling stressed, anxious, frustrated, overwhelmed and a variety of other emotions, cognitions and behaviours which to varying degrees surprised them.

== Research methods ==
As can be seen from the above, there are a number of reasons juries and jurors have become the target of investigation by legal practitioners and social scientists. Often overlooked is that correlation between the focus of investigation role played in the criminal justice system of the investigator or instructing organisation/individual(s) funding the research. The terms of reference, for example, for jury research performed on behalf of a trial lawyer seeking a beneficial outcome for his or her client, will most probably differ from those of a psychologist investigating the influence of say gender, demographic and personality variables on trial outcomes, which again will most probably differ from an examination by concerned members of the Judiciary about the ability of jurors to understand the legal argument, complex forensic evidence and instructions by the legal representatives in the courtroom.

Similarly methodology will differ depending on terms of reference, level of peer review, experience and ability of researchers and attitudes of funding organisations. Today, there are many companies and individuals providing services as jury consultants or trial strategists. Jury consultants use market research techniques in an attempt to bolster the client's chances of a positive outcome by 'gaining an understanding of the current and environment/location specific trends that might impact the attitudes of jurors. Their job is to shape trial team strategy so as to moderate or take advantage of jurors' preexisting beliefs and experiences by way of how the evidence is presented. Regular market research techniques are used in such instances (e.g., phone surveys, focus groups, feedback sessions etc.). Surrogate or mock jurors are selected carefully so that they are statistically representative of the 'general population in the particular region' and they are presented relevant information, visual exhibits, witness statements, legal cases, timelines etc. in an attempt to elicit a variety of responses, thus allowing the lawyers to prepare adequately for any possibility before it causes difficulty to their case. Jury consultants also use pre-trial techniques such as focus groups when preparing for settlement negotiations. Post-trial juror interviews sometimes allow for better understanding of mistakes or good arguments made in a trial, and that knowledge could be used for future trials or for an appeal. A recent innovation in this type of research is using electronic resources where lawyers 'pitch their submissions to online jurors'. More information about this resource can be found by following this link . Also on these pages are papers which outline some of the perceived benefits of this type of research along with the issues which are still topics of debate.

Jury consultancy is a growing industry and one which uses current technologies. However, this type of investigation makes up a relatively small proportion of Jury Research, the balance of which is generally conducted by psychologists, criminologists and other social scientists. As indicated above in discussions about the personal perspective of jurors, the interaction between the juror and other jurors, the Courtroom environment, etc. is complex and unusual in that the behaviours and expectations of jurors performing jury duty are different from everyday experiences. The tools of the social scientist have evolved over recent decades, allowing more variables to be considered when investigating phenomena. This is augmented by the development of computer programs that can perform complex multivariate and multilevel analyses of data and models. Nonetheless, flaws inherent in social research must be considered, identified and moderated, and this is particularly relevant in Jury research.

Jury research can be done with 'real jurors' or 'mock jurors'. Each of these methods has its downfalls and each provides its own slant on the juror experience.

Access to 'real jurors' is difficult to attain, and observation of jurors whilst performing their duty is prohibited for a variety of reasons, the most prominent of which is a reluctance to allow any imposition on the jurors whilst performing their duty, which might affect the trial's result. As such access to jurors, if allowed, is generally after they have been dismissed which raises difficulties with issues such as memory distortion, overload from stress or other factors which were more pertinent to the juror while on the jury; inability to recognise the influence of demographic factors on their deliberations, etc. These are all factors or variables which are difficult to tease out of the data, but the influence of which can be adjusted in the analysis of the data if the model is theoretically sound.

Research on mock jurors does not provide an avenue for the investigation of the 'Gestalt' of the juror experience. Mock Jurors are not 'in the midst of the experience', they are not imposed upon by the reality that the future of the person sitting before them will in some respects be influenced by them, their ability to concentrate, their attention to detail, their ability to negotiate with other jurors, and other factors which do impose on 'real jurors'. Although mock juror research may be sufficient for examinations of the general attitudes and beliefs of a community by jury consultants, when investigating the nuances of the internal processes involved in deliberating an outcome of a Court matter, mock jury research techniques fall short in terms of validity. However, again, Mock jury research has provided a significant pool of investigative pursuits and since the 1970s as a result of considerable debate surround the issues associated with simulated research, the design and methodological parameters of simulated jury research have been made more robust.

== See also ==
- Legal psychology
- Scientific jury selection
