= Voir dire =

Legal phrase for a variety of procedures connected with jury trials

Voir dire (/ˈvwɑːr dɪər/; from an Anglo-Norman term in common law meaning 'to speak the truth') is a legal term for procedures during a trial that help a judge decide certain issues:

- Prospective jurors are questioned to decide whether they can be fair and impartial.
- Witnesses are questioned to decide their competence to testify.
- Witnesses are questioned to decide the admissibility of evidence.

== Etymology ==
From Old French voir 'true' (from Latin verus 'true', from PIE root *were-o- 'true, trustworthy') and from Old French dire 'to say' (from Latin dicere 'speak, tell, say', from PIE root *deik- 'to show', also 'pronounce solemnly').

It originally referred to an oath taken by jurors to tell the truth (Latin: verum dicere). It comes from the Anglo-Norman language.

== Historic use ==
In earlier centuries, a challenge to a particular juror would be tried by other members of the jury panel, and the challenged juror would take an oath of voir dire, meaning to tell the truth. This procedure fell into disuse when the function of trying challenges to jurors was transferred to the judge.

== Commonwealth countries, Ireland and Hong Kong ==
In England and Wales, Cyprus, Hong Kong, Ireland, Australia, New Zealand, Papua New Guinea and Canada, it refers to a "trial within a trial". It is a hearing to determine the admissibility of evidence, or the competency of a witness or juror. As the subject matter of the voir dire often relates to evidence, competence or other matters that may lead to bias on behalf of the jury, the jury may be removed from the court for the voir dire.

Under Scots law, jury selection is random, and there are a few well-defined exclusions in criminal trials.

In Canada, the case of Erven v. The Queen holds that testimony on a voir dire cannot influence the trial itself. This remains true even if the judge ruled against the accused in the voir dire. The judge is assumed to ignore what they heard during voir dire. The jury is never present during a voir dire. However, since the evidence given at a voir dire may be redundant to evidence at trial, with the consent of the parties a procedure called a "blended voir dire" may be used to save time. In this procedure, evidence given in the voir dire, if then found admissible, is transferred into the main trial without having to be repeated.

In Australia, the rule about voir dire is in section 189 of the Evidence Act 1995 (Cth): "On a voir dire parties can call witnesses, cross-examine opponent's witnesses and make submissions- as they might in the trial proper." The term has thus been broadened in Australian jurisdictions to include any hearing during a trial where the jury is removed. The High Court of Australia has noted that the voir dire is an appropriate forum for the trial judge to reprimand counsel or for counsel to make submissions as to the running of the court to the trial judge.

== United States ==
U.S. v. Mohammed Hashim – defense voir dire of military judge

In the United States, voir dire is the process by which prospective jurors are questioned about their backgrounds and potential biases before being chosen to sit on a jury. It also refers to the process by which expert witnesses are questioned about their backgrounds and qualifications before being allowed to present their opinion testimony in court. As noted above, in the United States (especially in practice under the Federal Rules of Evidence) voir dire can also refer to examination of the background of a witness to assess their qualification or fitness to give testimony on a given subject. Voir dire is often taught to law students in trial advocacy courses.

Colloquially, among attorneys and their staff, the term is used to describe the process of selecting a jury in some jurisdictions. Jury selection differs based on the court and locality where a trial occurs. The process of jury selection and managing voir dire is a key area of study for criminal trial attorneys. The Center for Jury Studies, a project of the National Center for State Courts, has studied voir dire, as has The American Bar Association, and summaries of research conducted on voir dire are freely available in the OnlineJury Research Update (OJRU).

== See also ==
- Law French
- Strike for cause
