= Battle of Stalingrad in popular culture =

The Battle of Stalingrad (1942–1943), a battle on the Eastern Front of World War II, often regarded as the single largest and bloodiest battle in the history of warfare, and one of the most decisive battles of World War II, has inspired a number of media works.

== Films ==
=== Documentary films ===
- Stalingrad (1943), a Soviet film shot during the battle
- "Stalingrad". The World at War. (June 1942 – February 1943)

=== Cinematic films ===
- The Battle of Stalingrad (Сталинградская битва), a 1949 two-part Soviet movie
- Stalingrad: Dogs, Do You Want to Live Forever? (Hunde, wollt ihr ewig leben?), a 1958 West German film directed by Frank Wisbar
- Hot Snow a 1972 Soviet film about Soviet artillery during Operation Winter Storm
- Stalingrad, a 1989 two-part film directed by Yuri Ozerov
- Stalingrad, a 1993 German film directed by Joseph Vilsmaier
- Enemy at the Gates, a 2001 Franco-British film which dramatized and in some cases fictionalized elements of real exploits by sniper Vasily Zaytsev. Directed by Jean-Jacques Annaud and starring Jude Law, Joseph Fiennes, Ed Harris and Rachel Weisz
- Stalingrad (2013), a Russian film that tells the story of six Soviet reconnaissance troops and their part in the battle, holding a building along with various units to defend Stalingrad and Volga River from German attacks

== Games ==
=== Board games ===
- Stalingrad (1963), Avalon Hill
- Streets of Stalingrad (1979), Phoenix Games
- Turning Point: Stalingrad (1989), Avalon Hill
- Red Barricades: ASL Historical Module 1 (1990), Avalon Hill
- Memoir '44: Eastern Front (2005), Days of Wonder

=== Video games ===
- The Stalingrad Campaign (1986)
- Battlefield 1942 (2002) Stalingrad
- Commandos 3: Destination Berlin (2003) portrayed the battle in the Stalingrad campaign.
- Call of Duty (2003) famous moments such as crossing of the Volga and the battle for Pavlov's House are depicted in the Soviet campaign.
- Call of Duty: Finest Hour (2004) All except the last two levels of the Soviet campaign take part during the Battle of Stalingrad.
- Stalingrad (2005)
- Call of Duty 2 (2005)
- Call of Duty: World at War (2008) portrayed the battle in the first mission of the Soviet campaign, Vendetta, as well as the multiplayer map Revolution.
- Red Orchestra 2: Heroes of Stalingrad (2011), the single player campaign focuses on the Battle of Stalingrad, and several maps in the game portray famous locations of the battle, such as Pavlov's House, the Red October Factory and Mamayev Kurgan, among others. The Multiplayer also consisted of several famous locations from the single player so people could experience for themselves what it was like, to an extent.
- Company of Heroes 2 (2013) portrayed the battle in certain missions, but was heavily criticized by some Russian players for "being historically inaccurate", and on 7 August DVD sales of the Russian version of the game were halted in Russia, while the game is still available for downloading from Steam.
- IL-2 Sturmovik: Battle of Stalingrad (2013)
- Call of Duty: WWII (2017) - The multiplayer map Stalingrad is featured in the third DLC map pack United Front, set in the winter during the Battle of Stalingrad.
- Hell Let Loose (2021) - Highly detailed multiplayer map.
- Call of Duty: Vanguard (2021) - The campaign missions, Stalingrad and Lady Nightingale both take place in Stalingrad. The multiplayer map Red Star and the Zombies map Der Anfang both take place in the city with the latter being set after the Battle of Stalingrad.

== Literature ==
=== Fiction ===
- Grossman, Vasily (2006). Life and Fate. New York: New York Review of Books. A novel written by one of the most celebrated reporters in the Red Army.
- Grossman, Vasily (2019). Stalingrad (Grossman novel). New York: New York Review of Books. A prequel to Life and Fate, published earlier in Russia. This is the first comprehensive translation into English.
- Gerlach, Heinrich (2018). The Forsaken Army. Apollo. A 1957 German novel written by a Stalingrad veteran and translated into English in 2018. Gerlach wrote another version of this novel in 1945, which was confiscated by the Soviets, and found in Russian state archives in 2012.
- Konsalik, Heinz G. (1977). Doctor of Stalingrad. Tattoo Books. A novel focused on a German doctor in Stalingrad. Adapted for the film The Doctor of Stalingrad (1958).
- Littell, Jonathan (2006). Les Bienveillantes. Paris: Gallimard. A fictional story of a former SS officer, the third chapter ("Courante") takes place in Stalingrad. The book received two major French literary awards (the Grand Prix du roman de l'Académie française and the Prix Goncourt).
- Plievier, Theodor (1966) [1948]. Stalingrad. New York: Time Inc. A pseudo-memoir novel.
- Robbins, David L. (2000). War of the Rats. New York: Bantam Books. A novel which was later adapted for the film Enemy at the Gates (2001).
- Vollman, William T. (2005). Europe Central. New York: Penguin Books. A postmodern novel that received the 2005 National Book Award.
- Wilson, John (2005). Four Steps to Death. Toronto: Kids Can Press Ltd. A novel focused on a German tank officer, a Russian sniper, and a child living in Stalingrad. Received the White Pine Award.

=== Non-fiction ===
- Antony Beevor - Stalingrad: The Fateful Siege, 1942-1943. New York: Viking, 1998. An overall perspective of the battle. Noted for its extensive use of first-hand accounts.
- Viktor Nekrasov - In trenches of Stalingrad (Виктор Некрасов "В окопах Сталинграда")
- Last Letters from Stalingrad (German: Letzte Briefe aus Stalingrad), an anthology of letters from German soldiers who took part in the Battle for Stalingrad during World War II. Originally published in West Germany in 1950, the book was translated into many languages (into English by Anthony G. Powell in 1956), and has been issued in numerous editions.
- Glantz, David M. & House, Jonathan (1995), When Titans Clashed: How the Red Army Stopped Hitler, Lawrence, Kansas: University Press of Kansas, ISBN 0-7006-0899-0
- Glantz, David M. & House, Jonathan (2009), To the Gates of Stalingrad – Soviet-German combat operations April to August 1942, (Kansas UP) ISBN 978-0-7006-1630-5
- Glantz, David M. & House, Jonathan (2009), Armageddon in Stalingrad – September to November 1942, (Kansas UP), ISBN 978-0-7006-1664-0
- Glantz, David M. & House, Jonathan (2014), Endgame at Stalingrad - Book One: November 1942, (Kansas UP), ISBN 978-0700619542
- Glantz, David M. & House, Jonathan (2014), Endgame at Stalingrad - Book Two: December 1942 - January 1943, (Kansas UP), ISBN 978-0700619559
- Glantz, David (2011), 'After Stalingrad: The Red Army's Winter Offensive 1942–1943', Helion and Company, ISBN 978-1-907677-05-2

=== Poetry ===
- Pablo Neruda (1942). Canto a Stalingrado.
- Pablo Neruda (1943). Nuevo canto de amor a Stalingrado.
- Carlos Drummond de Andrade (1945). Carta a Stalingrado.
- Norman Nicholson. Stalingrad: 1942.
