= Soviet snipers =

World War II snipers of the Soviet Union

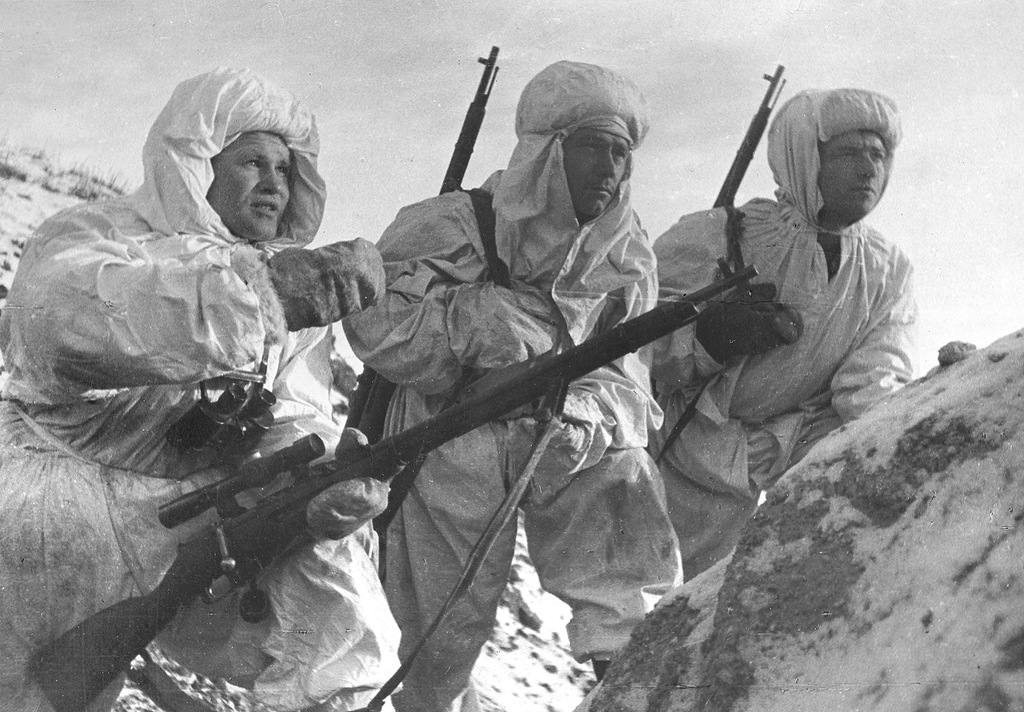
Vasily Zaytsev (left), possibly the best-known Soviet sniper, during the Battle of Stalingrad in December 1942

Snipers of the Soviet Union played an important role mainly on the Eastern Front of World War II, apart from other preceding and subsequent conflicts. In World War II, Soviet snipers used the 7.62×54mmR rifle cartridge with light, heavy, armour-piercing (B-30), armour-piercing-incendiary (B-32), zeroing-and-incendiary (P3), and tracer bullets. Most Soviet World War II snipers carried a combat load of 120 rifle cartridges in the field.

During World War II, 428,335 individuals, including partisans, are believed to have received sniper training from the Red Army, and of those 9,534 obtained higher-level qualifications. Unlike the militaries of other states, these snipers could be men or women. Between 1941 and 1945, a total of 2,484 Soviet female snipers were functioning in this role, of whom about 500 survived the war.

== History ==
In 1932, the "sharpshooters' movement" started under the supervision of Kliment Voroshilov. In 1938, Red Army snipers took part in the Battle of Lake Khasan against troops of the Imperial Japanese Army. The most successful Soviet use of snipers during the Second World War was during their defensive stages (1941–1943), after which the advantage of defense shifted to the German side and German snipers became a real danger to the advancing Soviet forces.

=== Doctrine ===
Soviet and Soviet-derived military doctrines include squad-level snipers, which may be called "sharpshooters" or "designated marksmen" in other doctrines (see the "Sniper" article). They do so because the long-range engagement ability was lost to ordinary troops when submachine guns (which are optimized for close-range, rapid-fire combat) were adopted.

Soviet military doctrine used snipers for providing long-distance suppressive fire and for eliminating targets of opportunity, especially leaders, because during World War II, Soviet military leaders and combat theorists (Vassili Zaitsev contributed greatly to Soviet sniper doctrine, although he was officially neither of these) found that military organisations have difficulty replacing experienced non-commissioned officers and field officers during times of war. They found that the more expensive and less rugged sniper rifles could match the cost-effectiveness of a cheaper assault rifle given good personnel selection, training, and adherence to doctrine. The Soviet Union used women for sniping duties, including Lyudmila Pavlichenko and Nina Lobkovskaya.

After the war, the standard Soviet Army sniper team consisted of a shooter and a spotter.

After the introduction of the Dragunov sniper rifle, the Soviet army deployed snipers at platoon level. Those snipers were often chosen from personnel who did well in terms of rifle marksmanship while members of DOSAAF. Such snipers were estimated to have a 50% probability of hitting a standing, man-sized target at 800 m (875 yd), and an 80% probability of hitting a standing, man-sized target at 500 m (547 yd). For distances not exceeding 200 m (219 yd) the probability was estimated to be well above 90%. To attain this level of accuracy, the sniper could not engage more than two such targets per minute.

== Rifles ==
The first Soviet sniper rifle was designed in 1927–1928. It was the 7.62mm Mosin Dragoon rifle with a D-III optical sight (7,62-мм драгунская винтовка обр. 1891 года с оптическим прицелом Д-III на кронштейне А.А. Смирнского).

In 1931, the Red Army adopted the 7.62mm Mosin sniper rifle with a PE optical sight (7,62-мм снайперская винтовка обр. 1891/31 гг. c оптическим прицелом ПЕ) as the standard sniper rifle

In 1940, the Red Army adopted the 7.62mm SVT-40 semi-automatic sniper rifle with a PU optical sight (7,62-мм снайперская винтовка СВТ-40 c оптическим прицелом ПУ) as their second model of standard sniper rifle. Due to several problems, including accuracy issues and muzzle flash, as well as being complex and slow to manufacture, production ceased in October 1941, and work began on developing the PU version of the Mosin–Nagant.

In 1941, several 7.62mm SVT-40 semi-automatic sniper rifles with a PU optical sight were converted to full-auto sniper rifles.

In 1942 the Red Army adopted the 7.62mm Mosin sniper rifle with a PU optical sight (7,62-мм снайперская винтовка обр. 1891/30 гг. c оптическим прицелом ПУ на кронштейне Д. М. Кочетова) as the standard sniper rifle

Later, the Red Army acquired a small number of AVS-36, which were converted into self-loading sniper rifles with PE optical sights (АВС-36 с оптическим прицелом ПЕ обр. 1931 года)

The three most common sniper rifles employed by the Soviet Union were the Mosin–Nagant, the Tokarev SVT-40, and later in 1963, the SVD, the first purpose-built designated marksmen's rifle.

The sniper version of the Mosin–Nagant rifle was used before, during, and after World War II. It used the standard bolt action 1891/30 infantry rifle as a platform, though rifles destined for conversion were hand-selected for quality and accuracy. Four-power scopes were added, and came in two versions. The PE scope was a copy of a German Zeiss scope, manufactured by Emil Busch AG. The PEM model was later introduced as a more reliable, easier to produce scope. The second version of the Mosin–Nagant sniper rifle with PU optical sight, began production late in 1942. This rifle included a simpler scope design, which was incorporated from the short-lived SVT-40, and was far easier to mass-produce. To this day, it remains the most widely produced and longest serving sniper rifle in the world, and remained the Soviet Union's main sniper rifle until it was superseded in 1962 by the semi-automatic SVD Dragunov rifle.

The SVD (Снайперская винтовка Драгунова) was officially adopted by the Soviet Armed Forces in 1963, though issued as early as 1958. The SVD was the Soviet Union's answer to requests for an updated sniper weapon. The rifle retained the use of the same 7.62×54mmR ammunition, but is a semi-automatic gas-operated rifle with a detachable 10-round box-style magazine. The SVD continues to be the standard sniper rifle of several countries, including those of former Warsaw Pact countries now NATO members.

In 1989, the VSS Vintorez was adopted by Soviet Spetsnaz troops.

== List of famous Soviet Union snipers ==
- Lyudmila Pavlichenko
- Vasily Zaytsev
- Roza Shanina
- Nina Petrova
- Nina Lobkovskaya
- Aliya Moldagulova
- Ivan Sidorenko
- Vasilij Kvachantiradze
- Semyon Nomokonov
- Natalya Kovshova
- Fyodor Okhlopkov
- Noah Adamia
- Fedir Dyachenko
- Maksim Passar
- Zhambyl Tulaev
- Tatyana Baramzina
- Tsyrendashi Dorzhiev
- Abukhadzhi Idrisov
- Mikhail Surkov
- Mariya Polivanova

== In popular culture ==
- A Hollywood film called Enemy at the Gates was made about Vasily Zaitsev, a Soviet sniper who fought in the Battle of Stalingrad. The plot of the movie is based on a section in the eponymous book by William Craig, which fictionalizes an alleged duel between Zaitsev and a (possibly) fictional German sniper called Major König.
- The role of a Soviet sniper is portrayed in the video game Call of Duty: World at War. On one of the maps, an injured sniper, Viktor Reznov (who gives the player "Dimitri Petrenko" the job of sniping) runs around to tempt German snipers into opening fire, revealing their position and allowing the player to snipe them.
- In Tom Clancy's novel The Bear and the Dragon, veteran World War II Soviet sniper Pavel Petrovich Gogol, late of the Iron & Steel Division, uses his scoped Mosin–Nagant rifle to kill a Chinese general during a Chinese invasion of Siberia at a range of 900 meters—well within the capabilities of the Mosin–Nagant.
- In David L. Robbins' novel War of the Rats, the lead character, Vasily Zaitsev, is a Soviet sniper in World War II.
- James Riordan's novel The Sniper tells the story of Tania Chernova and is based on Riordan's interviews with the subject.
- Four Steps to Death, a book written by John Wilson, portrays a Soviet sniper, Yelena Pavlova, as a main character in the Battle of Stalingrad
- The Forty-First (Сорок первый) by Boris Lavrenyov is a Soviet novel about a woman sniper in the Red Army during the Russian Civil War that was adopted into a silent film (The Forty-First (1927 film)) and then into a sound film (The Forty-First (1956 film)).
- The 2015 film Battle for Sevastopol is a joint Ukrainian-Russian film biography of Soviet sniper Lyudmila Pavlichenko, set during the 1941–42 siege of the Crimea. True to life, after being wounded, Lyudmila is evacuated to the United States, where she meets with Eleanor Roosevelt in a public relations campaign.

== Sources ==
- Снайперы в ночном поиске // "Красная звезда", № 201 (4051) от 1 сентября 1938. стр.4
- В. Ильенков. Снайпер Хасана // "Красная звезда", № 257 (4107) от 7 ноября 1938. стр.2
- подполковник П. Клевцов. Из стрелкового оружия на предельные дистанции // "Военный вестник", № 8, 1969. стр.107–112
- Снайпер // Большая Советская Энциклопедия. / под ред. А. М. Прохорова. 3-е изд. том 23. М., «Советская энциклопедия», 1976. стр.629
- Снайпер // Советская военная энциклопедия (в 8 тт.) / под ред. Н. В. Огаркова. том 7. М.: Воениздат, 1979. стр.403
