= Tania Chernova =

Female Soviet sniper during WWII

Tania Chernova (1920? – c. 2015?) was a Russian-American ballerina and medical trainee known for serving in the Red Army as a sniper during World War II. She traveled to Belarus to get her grandparents out of Russia, but upon arriving learned that German invaders had already killed them. After that, she joined the Soviet resistance on the Eastern Front, becoming an effective sniper.

== World War II ==
Chernova and her group went to Stalingrad by traveling through the sewer system to reach the Russian lines. After that, she joined Vasily Zaitsev's sniper school and trained as a sniper. The group of snipers that Zaitsev formed was called "The Hares". Chernova participated in a raid on a German headquarters after which she and the rest of the Hares claimed to have killed Germans by picking off guards one by one. Tania claimed she had killed 24 soldiers. Chernova and Zaitsev developed a relationship during the war, but were later separated.

While on the way to the German front lines with a small team to assassinate the commander of the German Army at the Battle of Stalingrad, Field Marshal Friedrich Paulus, Chernova was badly wounded in her abdomen when the woman ahead of her stepped on a land mine. Chernova was admitted to a hospital in Tashkent and later recovered. She had received misinformation about Zaitsev being killed in an explosion at Stalingrad. After her recovery, she married someone else, but could not conceive because of the injury.

== After the war ==
In 1969, Chernova was interviewed by American journalist William Craig, who asked her about her time in the Hares. Confused as to how he got this information, she immediately asked him where he heard that, and Craig replied that Zaitsev had told him. In the book Enemy at the Gates: The Battle for Stalingrad, based on his interviews, Craig wrote:

More than a quarter century after her vendetta against the enemy, the graying sniper still refers to the Germans she killed as "sticks" that she broke. For many years after the war she believed that Vassily Zaitsev, her lover, had died from grievous wounds. Only in 1969, did she learn that he had recovered and married someone else. The news stunned her for she still loved him.

Part of Craig's book details a love triangle between Commissar Danilov, Chernova and Zaitsev, which has been described as a work of fiction by English military historian Antony Beevor.

== Historicity ==
Historian Antony Beevor has questioned the veracity of Chernova's claims, due to his research indicating a lack of female Soviet snipers at Stalingrad. Craig reportedly had confirmation of Chernova's actions from Zaitsev, who trained her and had a relationship with her.

== In popular culture ==
A character based on Chernova, played by Rachel Weisz, appeared in the 2001 film Enemy at the Gates. This Chernova is a citizen of Stalingrad who has become a private in the local militia. Danilov has her transferred to an intelligence unit away from the battlefield. Zaitsev finds her in a field hospital where she is recovering from her wound.

Writer James Riordan has credited Chernova as being the inspiration for his historical fiction novel, The Sniper. Most of the events experienced by the novel's main character, Tania Belova, are based on the real life experiences of Chernova.
