= Enemy at the Gate =

Enemy at the Gate(s) may refer to:

== Art, entertainment, and media ==
=== Film ===
- Enemy at the Gates (2001), a war film titled after William Craig's 1973 book

=== Literature ===
- Enemy at the Gates: The Battle for Stalingrad (1973), William Craig's non-fiction book

=== Television ===
- "Enemy at the Gate" (Frasier), an episode of Frasier
- "Enemy at the Gate" (Stargate Atlantis), the final episode of Stargate Atlantis
- "Enemy at the Gates" (The Flash), an episode of The Flash
- "Enemy at the Gates" (The Legend of Korra), An episode of The Legend of Korra

== See also ==
- Enemy at the Door, a British television drama series
