= Vasil Kvachantiradze =

Soviet sniper (1907–1950)

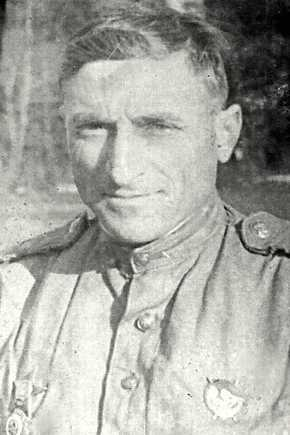
- Born: 2 January 1907; Konchkati, Russian Empire (now Georgia)
- Died: 9 February 1950 (aged 43); Georgian SSR, Soviet Union
- Military career
- Allegiance: Soviet Union
- Branch: Soviet Army
- Service years: 1932–1933; 1941–1945
- Rank: (sergeant major)
- Units: 650th Rifle Regiment, 138th Rifle Division; 259th Rifle Regiment, 179th Rifle Division
- Commands: forward observer unit, sniper unit
- Conflicts: World War II; Battle of Stalingrad; Vitebsk–Orsha offensive; Operation Bagration
- Awards: Hero of the Soviet Union

Vasil Shalvas dze Kvachantiradze (Georgian: ვასილ შალვას ძე კვაჭანტირაძე; Russian: Василий Шалвович Квачантирадзе, romanized: Vasily Shalvovich Kvachantiradze; 15 January [O.S. 2 January] 1907 – 9 February 1950) was a Soviet sniper during World War II. He is credited with confirmed kills numbering at least 215 officers and soldiers of the German Wehrmacht during the Vitebsk–Orsha offensive and 517 confirmed kills total during the war, thus being considered as one of the deadliest snipers in history.

== Early life ==
Kvachantiradze was born on 15 January [O.S. 2 January] 1907 in the village Konchkati, Georgia, then part of the Russian Empire. Vasil grew up within a peasant family and spent his youth working and assisting on the farm of his parents until he became a member of the Communist Party of Georgia in 1939. He also briefly served in the Red Army from 1932 to 1933.

== World War II ==
When the war broke out Kvachantiradze was drafted again in 1941 by the regional military commissariat and deployed as a sniper in the Soviet 650th Rifle Regiment, 138th Rifle Division. He proved himself during the Battle of Stalingrad where he killed 60 enemy soldiers with his sniper rifle. In August 1942 Vasil was wounded for the first time and after his return, was transferred to the 179th Rifle Division, then part of the Soviet 43rd Army. By October 1942 he had amounted a total of 81 kills, for which he was awarded the Order of the Red Star.

During the defensive battles around Prechistensky and Slobodskoy districts, Kvachantiradze fought in the 259th Rifle Regiment, 138th Rifle Division, where he went out on missions daily and was awarded with the Order of the Red Banner for 113 confirmed kills. By June 1944 Vasil Kvachantiradze in the rank of Starshina, had already suffered five battle wounds and with a personal score of 221, was regarded as the best sniper of the 43rd Army. For his success, he was nominated for the title Hero of the Soviet Union.

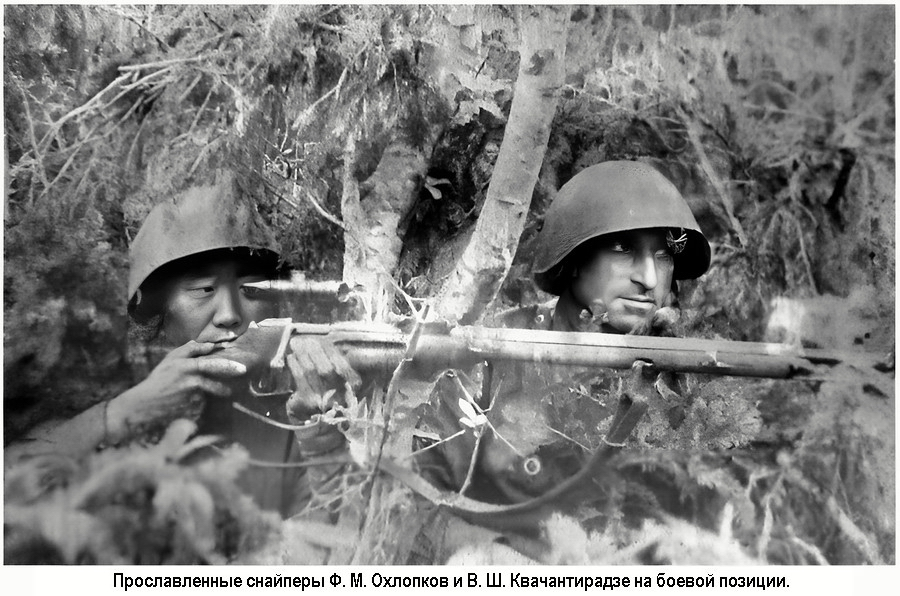
Snipers Fyodor Okhlopkov and Vasil Kvachantiradze in combat position

Kvachantiradze distinguished himself again in 1944 during the liberation of Vitebsk, Belarus, part of the East Prussian Offensive. He killed 44 enemy soldiers during an attempted breakthrough of German troops around Shumilino and is credited with 215 kills in the period from June to December 1944, which brought the total tally at that time to 517 enemy soldiers and officers. In the battle at Shumilino Vasil's detachment was encircled by counterattacks and temporarily cut off from the rest of their regiment. The sniper reportedly managed to improvise traps and ambushes without exposing their position a single time. Due to continuous harassment and resistance, the Germans were not able to secure the area, which was considered important for creating a defensive line. A combined Soviet infantry and mechanized assault eventually broke through and defeated them.

Vasil Kvachantiradze also worked with Kuzma Danilovich Smolensky and under Fyodor Okhlopkov, two other eminent Soviet snipers. Together with Smolensky he was involved in training an additional 50 snipers for the war efforts. With Okhlopkov they became the deadliest sniper team in the Soviet Union with a total of 644 kills. During the entire period from 1941 to 1945, Kvachantiradze personally scored a total of 517 kills, Smolensky 414 and Okhlopkov 429. On March 24, 1945, the Presidium of the Supreme Soviet decided to bestow upon him the title "Hero of the Soviet Union" with Gold Star Medal and a second Order of Lenin.

== Awards ==
For his formidable efforts during the war, Kvachantiradze was awarded the title Hero of the Soviet Union, Order of Lenin twice gold star medal, Order of the Red Banner twice, Order of the Patriotic War twice and the Order of the Red Star.

Letters of recommendation
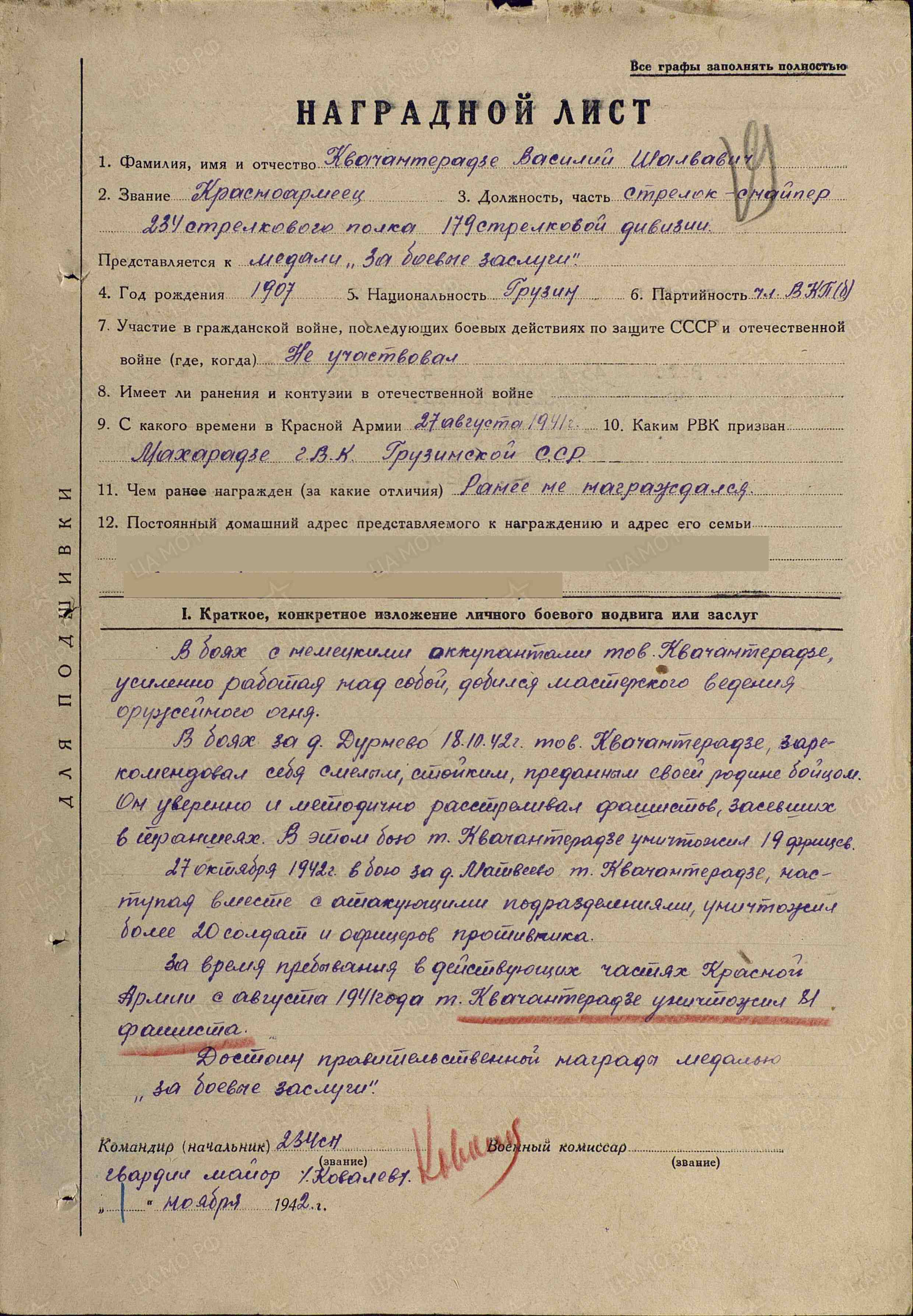
Order of the Red Star

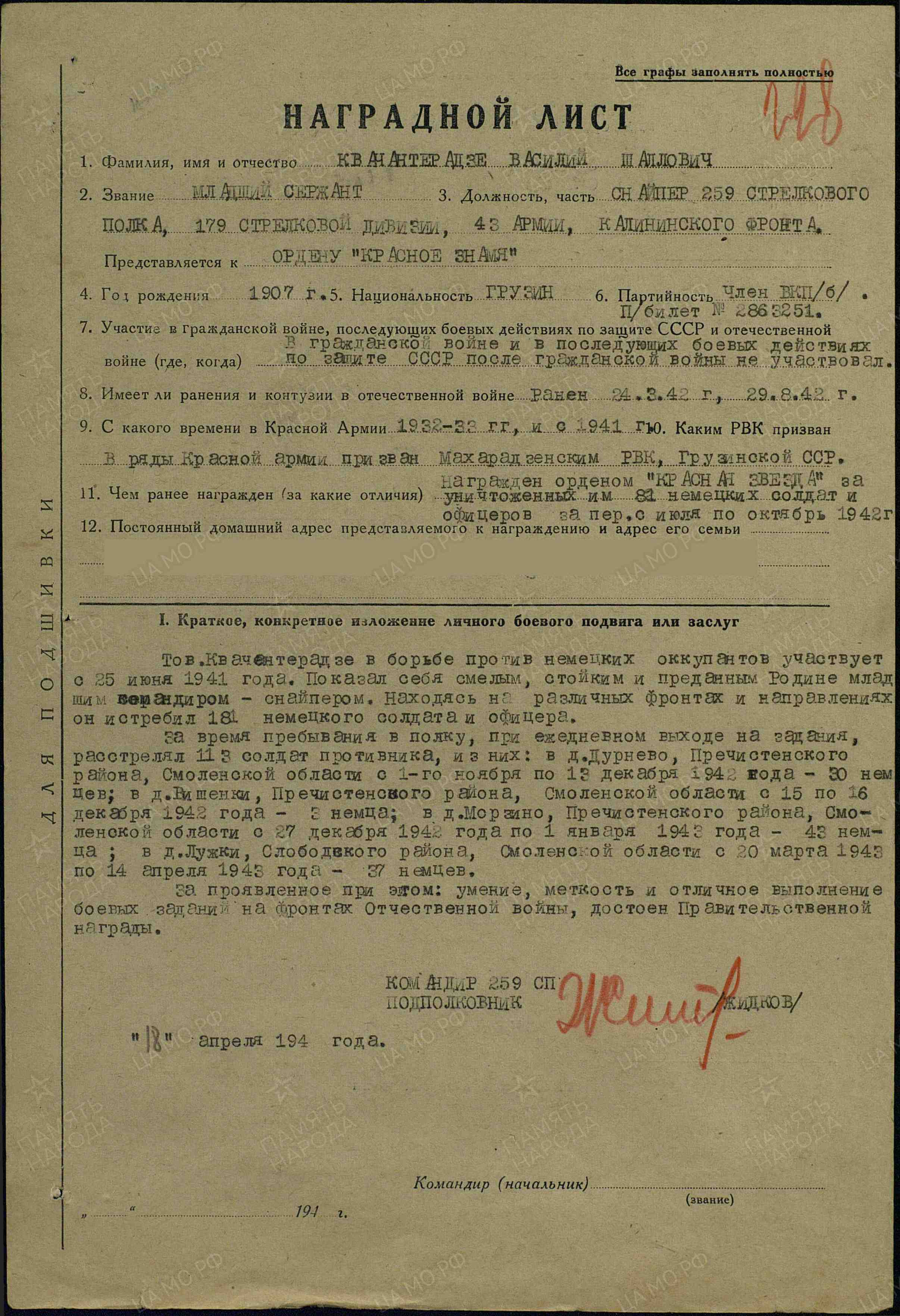
Order of the Red Banner

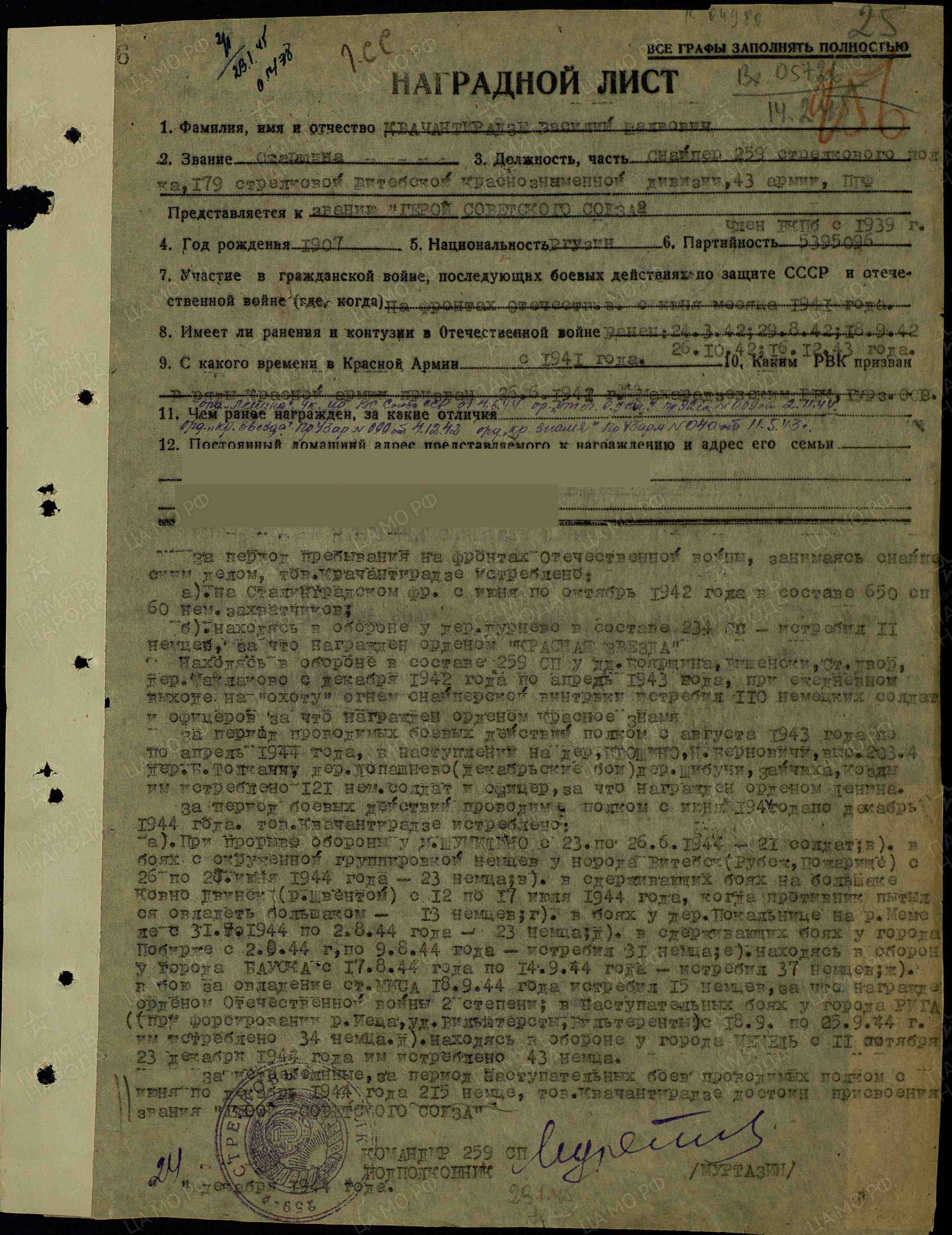
Hero of the Soviet Union

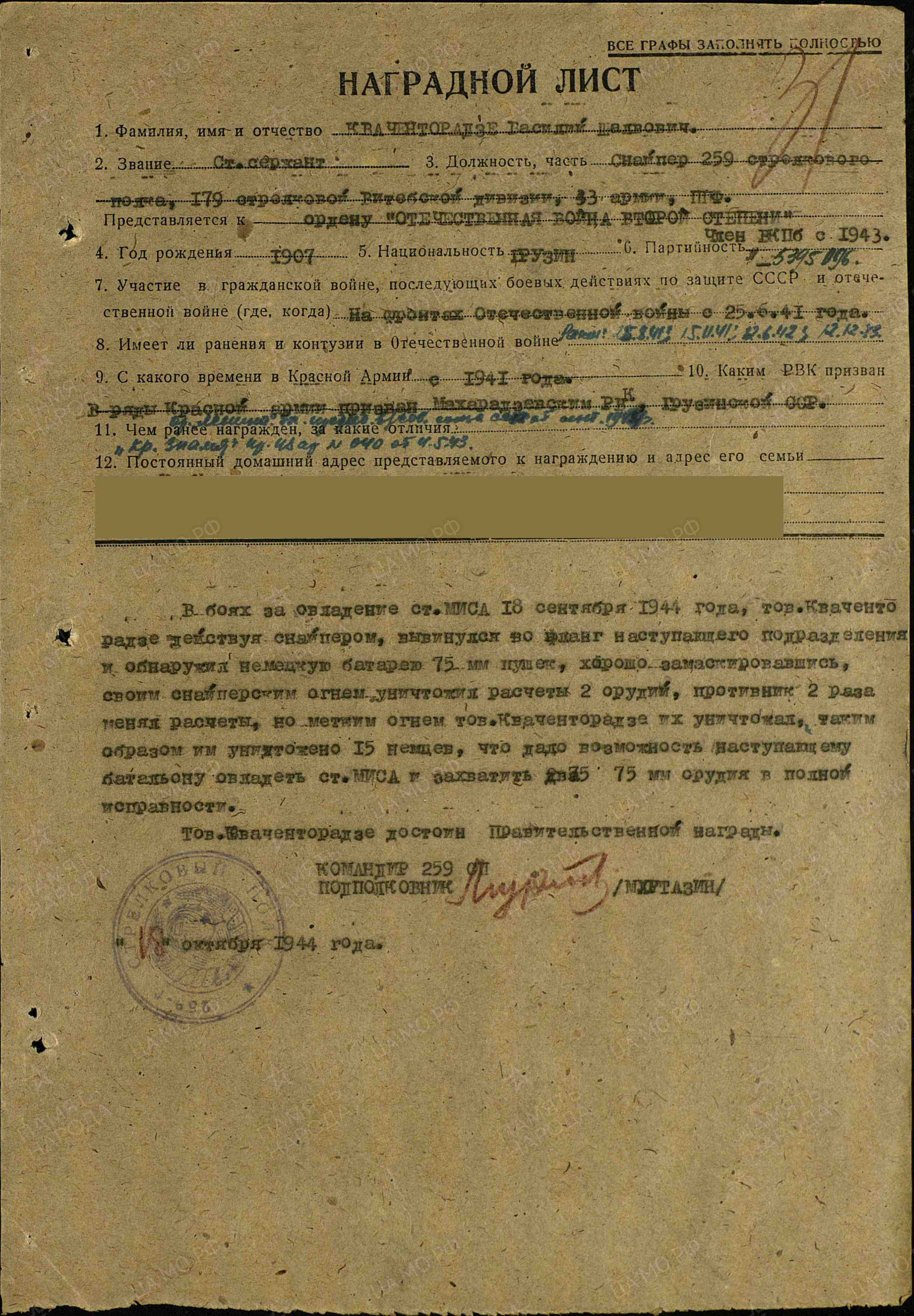
Order of the Patriotic War

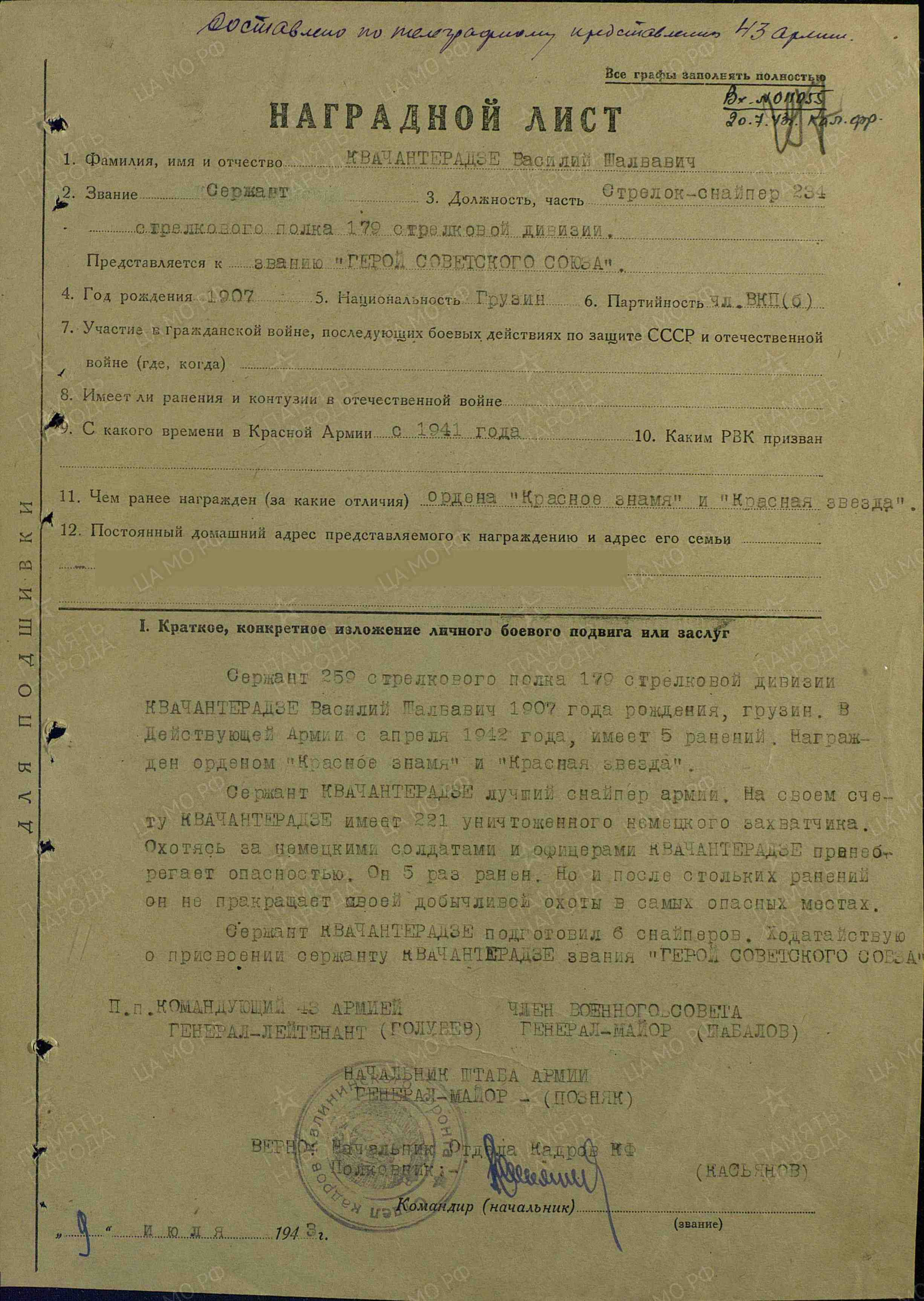
Order of Lenin

== Postwar ==
Kvachantiradze left the army in 1945 and became a head of a Kolkhoz as well as deputy Supreme Soviet of Soviet Georgia. Vasil Shalvovich Kvachantiradze died on February 9, 1950, at the age of 43.

== See also ==
- Noah Adamia
- Snipers of the Soviet Union
- List of books, articles and documentaries about snipers
