= War of the Rats =

1999 novel by David L. Robbins

- The War of the Rats book cover
- Author: David L. Robbins
- Language: English
- Genre: World War II, Historical fiction
- Publisher: Bantam Books
- Publication date: 1999
- Media type: Print
- Pages: 512
- ISBN: 0-553-58135-X
- OCLC: 44451243

War of the Rats is a World War II novel written by David L. Robbins in 1999.

The book has sold worldwide in over 20 languages.

== Synopsis ==
The plot focuses on a 1942 battle between the Nazi Germans and the Soviets set in Stalingrad, Soviet Union. The battle is declared by Viktor Tabori to be "Rattenkrieg"; translated, War of the Rats.

The story focuses in on the lives of two expert snipers, a Russian and a German, each with the goal of killing the other. The two snipers, Army Chief Master Sergeant Vasily Zaytsev of the Red Army and SS Colonel Heinz Thorvald of the German army, are equally matched. However, the story is complicated when a female sniper, Tania Chernova, becomes one of Vasily's most talented assistants and his battlefield lover.

=== Part 1: The Corporal, The Hare, The Partisan, and The Headmaster ===
The novel starts out from the point of view of Nikki Mond. He is talking with a soldier when suddenly the soldier is shot down by a sniper. Vasily Zaitsev and Viktor Medvedev are shown shooting down the soldier and then move their gear a minute later. Medvedev signs Zaitsev's sniper journal as a witness. The story switches to Thorvald who is teaching at the SS's elite sniper school. At this point all of the characters are just being introduced. Zaitsev reveals that he has many unique techniques he learned from hunting in the taiga. Colonel Nikolai Batyuk calls Zaitsev to talk and afterwards has a job offer for Zaitsev. He wants him to start a sniper school. Later the story switches to Tania Chernova on a barge in the 284th division. Her ship gets blown out of the water and she is forced to swim to shore with Fedya, a young recruit, and Yuri, an older soldier. They are forced to crawl through sewers for a long time underneath the fighting in Stalingrad. Yuri collapses from exhaustion and they are forced to leave him behind to die. Just as Tania and Fedya collapse from lack of oxygen they find a manhole and are able to crawl out of the sewers. They make it to the main Russian force and Tania decides to join the school run by Zaitsev. The snipers take a three-day course focused on tactics, shooting skills, and techniques. On the final day they go on their own mission. One night Zaitsev comes and asks a couple members to come with him and blow up an officer's barracks with him. They are almost caught but successfully blow it to pieces.

=== Part 2: The Duel ===
The Germans decide that it would be great to silence the Russian "hero" Zaitsev that has made many appearances in the Russian papers. They decide to call in Colonel Thorvald, Germany's best sniper, to silence him. Thorvald makes no attempt to hide his presence in Stalingrad. He shoots recklessly at whoever comes within his sights. He shoots a few of Zaitsev's trainees. He put one of his bullets through the opposing sniper's scope just to show his accuracy. After a few days Zaitsev decides to confront the hidden super-sniper and end the "mini war." For three days he searches an open courtyard full of rubble. They both know the other is there, but they do not know where. Thorvald has dug a small hole under a piece of metal so he can relax and can sit in complete darkness away from the sun. It also muffles his rifle shot when he shoots. On the third day Zaitsev brings Danilov along who helps search for Thorvald. He thinks he spots him and jumps up, and Thorvald puts a bullet through his chest. That is when Zaitsev figures out where Thorvald is hiding. He works all night setting up fake posts and his shooting spot for the coming morning. The next day Thorvald immediately notices differences near the Russian trenches. He spots one of Zaitsev's decoys, but also notices the empty mortar shell where he thinks Zaitsev is hiding. Thorvald decides to shoot at the sniper in the decoy and then at Zaitsev. He pulls the trigger, and thinks he hit the other sniper. Meanwhile, Zaitsev watches for the flash of Thorvald's gun. He sees it, waits, then pulls the trigger. Thorvald was never able to fire his second shot. That night Zaitsev goes to check on Thorvald's body. On one last mission, Zaitsev, Tania and some others are sneaking towards a German base when Tania steps on a mine. Zaitsev carries her back to a hospital and they are forced to remove a kidney and she loses a lot of blood. Zaitsev never leaves her side. When she finally wakes up she talks to Zaitsev and her chances do not seem good.

=== Part 3: The Cauldron ===
The final chapter features Nikki Mond, Thorvald's accomplice while he was alive. Nikki is wandering about the German camps, talking with soldiers and thinking about the war. The Germans are surrounded by a huge number of Russian troops and they have almost no chance of escaping without being taken prisoner. Their resources were being depleted and some men had resorted to cannibalism. He sums it up with one good thought:

"With duty gone from around your shoulders, you see all the lies clearly because duty makes you blind. Look down at duty, with a broken back now, hissing weakly up at me from the floor. I see everything revealed. Hitler. Stalin. Churchill. Mussolini. Roosevelt. Hirohito. Like the men singing on the radio, a chorus of liars. They must be liars because this war they’ve told us to wage cannot be the truth for mankind. It must be an insane lie!"

== Characters ==
Chief Master Sergeant Vasily Zaitsev, nicknamed "the Rabbit" or "the Hare", was born on 23 March 1915 in the Chelyabinsk Region of the Ural Mountains. Growing up he learned from his grandfather how to trap, hunt, and stalk animals in the taiga. It was there he learned his philosophy "pull the trigger once per animal". He was recruited in 1937 to the Russian Army, also known as the Red Army, which began as a communist combatants group in the Russian civil War. Zaitsev volunteered to be transferred to the front lines when the Nazis invaded the Soviet Union. His first claim to fame was during some of the first encounters, when he shot down an enemy officer and two soldiers at 800 meters. He was awarded the Medal of Valor and given a sniper rifle. Zaitsev helped progress the movement towards a large sniper system in the Soviet Army by helping teach at a Sniper school based in a manufacturing plant. He was eventually taken to Moscow in 1943 after being blinded and wounded by a mortar. He was operated on and was able to return to battle. Finally in 1945 he left the war with the final rank of Captain and worked as an engineer. Vasily Zaitsev's highest awards include: Hero of the Soviet Union, Order of Lenin, Order of the Red Banner (twice), Order of the Patriotic War (First Class), Medal for the Defense of Stalingrad and the Medal for the Victory Over Germany. In "War of the Rats", Zaitsev falls in love with Tania Chernova, a Russian American who joined the sniper school he taught in.

Colonel Heinz Thorvald, also known as Erwin Konig, may or may not even be a real person in the Battle of Stalingrad. Both were popular German names at the time and there is much debate on whether Thorvald's "character" was a fabrication or if he was actually real. In the book Thorvald describes himself as a coward who hides behind the lines and steals the lives of others. He grew up as a trap shooter and was known as one of the best shooters in the German Army.

Colonel Heinz Thorvald was joined by Corporal Nikki Mond in his search to find and kill Vasily Zaytsev. Nikki acted as a spotter and general accomplice to Thorvald.

Tania Chernova is an American with family ties to Russia. Her family was killed during the war and the only thing she wants is revenge. She joined the sniper school run by Zaitsev and became one of his top students as well as his lover, however her hotheadedness held her back from success because of her anger towards the German Army. However she works past that to become one of the better snipers. Later on in the book she was wounded by a blast from a hidden mine.

A supporting character siding with the Red Army is Captain Igor Semyonovich Danilov, a reporter for the Red Star, a Russian newspaper. He joins Zaitsev at the school and on a few of his missions to report Zaitsev's heroic events and ingenious tactics as a sniper. Danilov eventually is shot down by Thorvald when he spots Thorvald through a periscope and jumps up to yell.

== Historical accuracy ==
Zaitsev was a senior sergeant of the 2nd Battalion, 1047th Rifle Regiment, 284th Tomsk Rifle Division. He was interviewed by Vasili Grossman during the battle, and the account of that interview, lightly fictionalized in his novel, Life and Fate (Part One, Chapter 55), is substantially the same as that portrayed in the novel, without putting a name to the German sniper that he dueled with. On the other hand, the duel is portrayed quite differently in Zaitsev's own book, Notes of a Sniper, and in William Craig's 1974 history Enemy at the Gates: The Battle for Stalingrad.
