= Bombing of Stalingrad =

WW II bombings of the city today namned Volgograd

- Part of Battle of Stalingrad
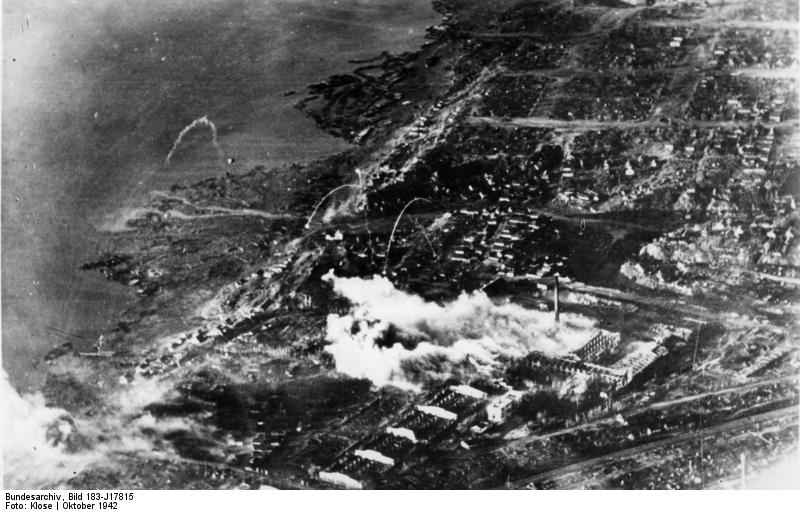
- The ruins of Stalingrad on 2 October 1942
Date	23-24 August 1942
Location	Stalingrad, Soviet Union (now Volgograd, Russia) 48°42′31″N 44°30′53″E
Result	Widespread destruction of the city

Belligerents
Germany	Soviet Union

Units involved
(Nazi Germany) Luftflotte IV; Fliegerkorps VIII	(Soviet Union) Soviet Air Forces

Strength
400 bombers	Unknown

Casualties and losses
- see Aftermath

The bombing of Stalingrad occurred during the Battle of Stalingrad in World War II, when the Soviet city and industrial centre on the river Volga was bombed heavily by the German Luftwaffe. German land forces comprising the 6th Army had advanced to the suburbs of Stalingrad by August 1942. The city was firebombed with 1,000 tons of high explosives and incendiaries in 1,600 sorties on 23 August. The aerial assault on Stalingrad was the most concentrated on the Ostfront, according to Beevor, and was the single most intense aerial bombardment on the Eastern Front at that point. At least 90% of the housing stock was obliterated during the first week of the bombing, with estimations of some 40,000 killed, possibly as many as 70,000 killed, though these may be exaggerations. (Note: According to British historian Richard Overy, this figure does not stand up to scrutiny. Overy writes that between July and October 1942 the local civil defence authorities counted 3,931 deaths, a figure much more consistent with the scale of the raiding and the tonnage of bombs dropped. The German bomber force was much smaller than the later Allied forces which could indeed obliterate half a city under the right circumstances. There were only 400 aircraft, all of them medium bombers, and the final tally of 1,000 tons represented what the same force had dropped on London in one night without exacting more than 1,000–2,000 deaths. Stalingrad was a modern city, with wide roads, parks, and a great many more stone and concrete buildings than less modern Russian cities. As in other more modern cities, it would have been difficult to generate a firestorm sufficient to consume 40,000 people.) It is also estimated that 150,000 people were wounded. Further fire-attacks were mounted against the ruined city for the following two days, enveloping it in dense black smoke.

Soviet forces hiding in the rubble were subjected to repeated German airstrikes until the Soviet counteroffensive in late November 1942. Luftflotte 4 flew nearly 1,000 sorties per day on average from 23 August to 22 November, the bulk of which were directed at Stalingrad.

== Background ==
Luftwaffe General Martin Fiebig's Fliegerkorps VIII was tasked in July 1942 with providing air support for the German 6th Army and 4th Panzer Army as they captured Stalingrad and secured the northern flank of the German advance to the Caucasus oilfields.

Luftflotte 4, commanded by Fiebig's superior, Generaloberst Wolfram von Richthofen, held a 1,600-kilometer eastern frontage in July and concentrated its efforts on Stalingrad, with low priority given to air support missions in the Caucasus under Kurt Pflugbeil's Fliegerkorps IV and in the Battle of Voronezh. Logistics for Fliegerkorps VIII received the highest preference, as Richthofen saw the capture of Stalingrad as the key to German success on the entire Eastern Front. Richthofen requested additional Junkers Ju 52 transport groups from Oberkommando der Luftwaffe and transferred Pflugbeil's groups, as well as his road transport companies, to the administrative authority of a new, specially created "Stalingrad transport region". He also ordered better procedures and greater efforts to maximize efficiency. His activities bore fruit as the Luftwaffe constantly lifted ammunition, provisions, and fuel to the front. The army (Heer) implemented its own initiatives to increase supply effectiveness, the insufficient perfection of which had undermined the speed of the German advance since the beginning of Case Blue in June. By the third week of August, the 6th Army and Fliegerkorps VIII were receiving sufficient supplies to undertake without undue difficulties their primary mission of capturing Stalingrad.

== Prelude ==
During the Battle of Kalach, Fliegerkorps VIII provided the German XIV and XXIV Panzer Corps with decisive air support as the Soviet 62nd Army was encircled and destroyed west of Kalach from 8–11 August through the application of superior German firepower from all sides and especially from above. Fifty thousand prisoners were taken by the Germans, 1,100 Soviet tanks were destroyed or captured, and the road to Stalingrad was clear.

LI Army Corps penetrated across the Don north of Kalach on 21 August, forcing the outmanouvred Red Army formations to the south to fall back on Stalingrad. XIV Panzer Corps crossed the Don the next morning across two large pontoon bridges created by German engineers. Fiebig's air corps shot down 139 Red aircraft in three days and inflicted significant damage on Soviet ground forces. On 21 August, Kampfgeschwader 76's Junkers Ju 88 medium bombers decimated two Soviet reserve divisions on open fields 150 kilometers east of Stalingrad.

Within two days of crossing the Don, Gustav Anton von Wietersheim's XIV Panzer Corps rolled forth to reach the Volga river at Spartanovka in the northern suburbs of Stalingrad at 16:00 on 23 August. Stavka was surprised by the speed of Wietersheim's advance. It was accomplished largely thanks to German airpower. Fliegerkorps VIII flew 1,600 unbroken sorties, blasting a path for the Panzer spearheads by dropping 1,000 tons of bombs on 23 August. Junkers Ju 87 Stuka dive bombers, Focke-Wulf Fw 190 ground attack aircraft, and Heinkel He 111 and Junkers Ju 88 medium bombers bombed and strafed the paralyzed Soviets, landed, refueled, restocked their ordnance, and flew more missions. Fliegerkorps VIII lost three aircraft that day, while destroying 91 Soviet aircraft and inflicting major damage on the Soviets on the ground.

== Destruction of Stalingrad ==
This was the first half of the attacks by Fliegerkorps VIII of 23 August; the second air offensive that day was carried out against the city of Stalingrad itself. From 3:18 pm on 23 August 1942 and through the night into 24 August, units of Richthofen's Luftflotte 4 constantly attacked the city. Medium bomber strength was employed, and included elements of KG 27, KG 51, KG 55, KG 76, and I/KG 100.

During 23 August Luftflotte 4 flew approximately 1,600 sorties and dropped 1,000 tons of bombs on the city, effectively destroying it, while three aircraft were lost. Buildings crumbled under the blast effects of high explosives, while the extensive use of incendiaries torched factories, schools, and houses. Wooden houses were incinerated, leaving only their chimneys. In the first few hours of bombing, the headquarters of the city's air defenses were bombed. Stalingrad was enveloped in dense black smoke clouds that stretched 3.5 kilometers upwards. Oil storage containers and fuel tankers were destroyed, spilling their contents of burning oil into the Volga's surface. The city was quickly turned to rubble, although some factories survived and continued production whilst workers militia joined in the fighting.

After 23 August, Stalingrad was bombed block-by-block for a further five days. According to official statistics, the Soviet fighter defences of 8 VA and 102 IAD PVO claimed 90 German planes shot down, in addition to 30 by anti-aircraft defense. The Soviet Air Force in the immediate area lost 201 aircraft from 23–31 August; despite meager reinforcements of some 100 aircraft in August, it had 192 serviceable aircraft, which included 57 fighters. The burden of the initial defense of the city fell on the 1077th Anti-Aircraft (AA) Regiment.

By the morning of 24 August, the destruction was obvious, as William Craig states that "the city of Stalingrad looked as though a giant hurricane had lifted it into the air and smashed it down again in a million pieces. The downtown section was almost flat, with nearly a hundred blocks still engulfed by raging fires." Stalin resisted the evacuation of civilians, in part due to the importance of the city's factories to the war effort. Initial Soviet reports stated the water supply and electricity grid as knocked out. Air-raid shelters in the city were extremely inadequate for the Soviet population, and large portions of the suburban buildings were made of easily flammable wood.

== Aftermath ==
On 26 August a detailed Soviet Urban Committee of Defence report gave the following casualty figures: 955 dead and 1,181 wounded. Due to the fighting that followed and the high death toll, it is impossible to know how many more were killed in aerial attacks. It is generally estimated that more than 40,000 people, mostly civilians, lost their lives during the attack, with one estimate as high as 70,000. So It is also estimated that 150,000 were wounded as a result. The death toll and destruction from the bombing was comparable to the British bombing of Darmstadt on 11/12 September 1944, when 900 tons of bombs from 226 Avro Lancaster heavy bombers killed 12,300 German citizens (or possibly even twice that).

However, historian Richard Overy considers this exaggerated. A report cited by Overy which was issued by the Main Directorate of Local Air Defence (MPVO) on 20 June 1945 regarding the civilian casualties as a result of air raids over Soviet population centres further registered a total of 19,822 civilian casualties of which 7,846 dead and 11,976 wounded between 1 July 1942 and 1 January 1943.

== Further operations ==
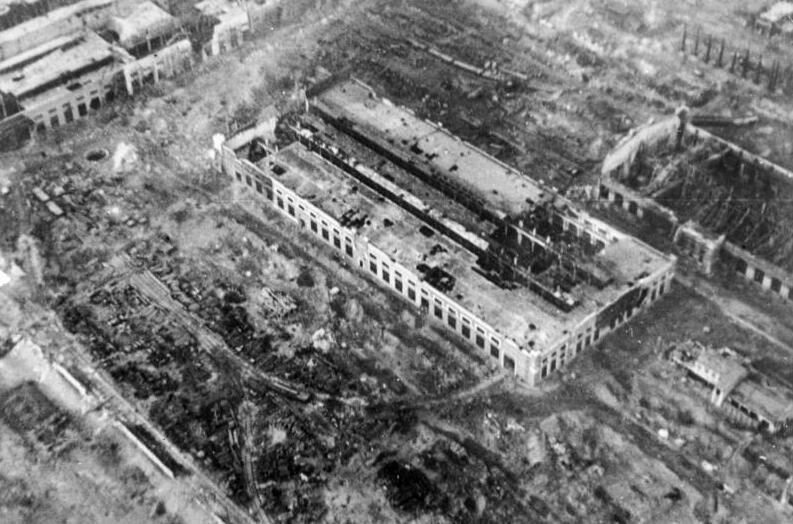
An industrial plant in Stalingrad destroyed by Stukas (1942)

Wietersheim's isolated Panzer Corps was subjected to heavy Soviet counterattacks, which threatened to destroy it. Fliegerkorps VIII airstrikes helped stop these attacks. Richthofen demanded an immediate, all-out attack to take the city. Hermann Hoth's 4th Panzer Army, stopped for days far to the south of Stalingrad due to a lack of fuel, recommenced its offensive on 28 August with strong support from the Stukas and Fw 190s of Fliegerkorps VIII. Hoth's Panzer Divisions outflanked the Soviets on 29 August, who fell back on Stalingrad. On 30 August Richthofen, believing the fall of Stalingrad to be imminent, ordered fresh attacks on the city to break the Soviet will to resist. That day and the next, Fliegerkorps VIII launched full-scale bombing operations against the city, also attacking Soviet airfields east of the Volga to maintain German air superiority.

Luftflotte 4 defeated the VVS in the airspace above the city, restricting the Soviets to night operations. The Germans obtained daylight air superiority over the Stalingrad area and exploited their edge to devastating effect. From 5 to 12 September, Luftflotte 4 conducted 7,507 sorties (938 per day). From 16 to 25 September, it carried out 9,746 sorties (975 per day). On 14 October it launched 1,250 sorties against Soviet positions west and east of the Volga and Soviet traffic along the river. That same day, its three Stuka Geschwader mounted 320 sorties against the Soviet positions on the west bank, dropping 540 tons of bombs on them.

Over the course of the battle through to late 1942, the Germans flew 70,000 sorties dropping over a million bombs.

== See also ==
- German bombing of Belgrade

== Sources ==
- Bellamy, Chris (2007). Absolute War: Soviet Russia in the Second World War. New York: Alfred A. Knopf & Random House. ISBN 978-0-375-41086-4.
- Bergström, Christer [in Swedish] (2007). Stalingrad – The Air Battle: 1942 through January 1943. Hinkley: Midland Publishing. ISBN 978-1-85780-276-4.
- Craig, William (1973). Enemy at the Gates: The Battle for Stalingrad. New York: Penguin Books. ISBN 0-14-200000-0.
- Hayward, Joel S.A. (1998). Stopped at Stalingrad. Lawrence, Kansas: University Press of Kansas. ISBN 978-0-7006-1146-1.
- Overy, Richard (2013). The Bombing War Europe 1939-1945. Penguin Books. p. 211. ISBN 978-0-713-99561-9.
