= Dorzhiev =

Dorzhiev is a surname. Notable people with the surname include:

- Agvan Dorzhiev (1853–1938), Russian-born Buryat Tibetan Buddhist monk
- Tsyrendashi Dorzhiev (1912–1943), Soviet sniper during World War II
- Tsyren-Dashi Dorzhiev (born 1962), Russian politician
