= Vasily Zaitsev (sniper) =

Soviet sniper (1915–1991)

- Василий Григорьевич Зайцев
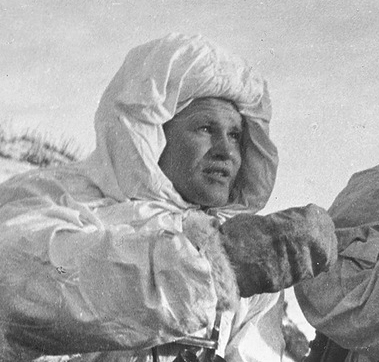
- Zaitsev in Stalingrad, December 1942
- Born: 23 March 1915; Yeleninskoye, Orenburg Governorate, Russian Empire
- Died: 15 December 1991 (aged 76); Kiev, Ukrainian SSR, Soviet Union
- Burial place: Mamayev Kurgan, Volgograd, Russia (from 2006)
- Military career
- Allegiance: Soviet Union
- Branch: Soviet Navy; Red Army
- Service years: 1937–1945
- Rank: Captain
- Conflicts: World War II; Eastern Front; Battle of Stalingrad; Battle of Seelow Heights
- Awards: See list

Vasily Grigoryevich Zaitsev (Russian: Васи́лий Григо́рьевич За́йцев, IPA: [vɐˈsʲilʲɪj ɡrʲɪˈɡorʲjɪvʲɪdʑ ˈzajtsɨf]; 23 March 1915 – 15 December 1991) was a Soviet sniper who served in World War II. Between 22 September and 17 December 1942, during the Battle of Stalingrad, he killed 265 enemy soldiers

Zaitsev became a celebrated figure during the war and later a Hero of the Soviet Union, and he remains lauded for his skills as a sniper. His life and military career have been the subject of several books and films: his exploits, as detailed in William Craig's 1973 book Enemy at the Gates: The Battle for Stalingrad, served as the story for the 2001 film Enemy at the Gates, with Jude Law portraying Zaitsev. He is also featured in David L. Robbins's 1999 historical novel War of the Rats.

== Early life ==
Zaitsev was born in Yeleninskoye, Orenburg Governorate in a Russian peasant family and grew up in the Ural Mountains, where he learned marksmanship by hunting deer and wolves with his grandfather and older brother. He brought home his first trophy at the age of 12, a wolf that he killed with a single shot from his first gun (given to him by his grandfather), a single-shot 20-gauge shotgun.

In 1930, Zaitsev graduated from construction college in the city of Magnitogorsk, where he received the speciality of fitter. He also studied accounting.

From 1937, Zaitsev served in the Pacific Fleet, where he was clerk of the artillery department. After studying at military school, he was appointed head of the finance department of the Pacific Fleet in Transfiguration Bay.

== Military career ==
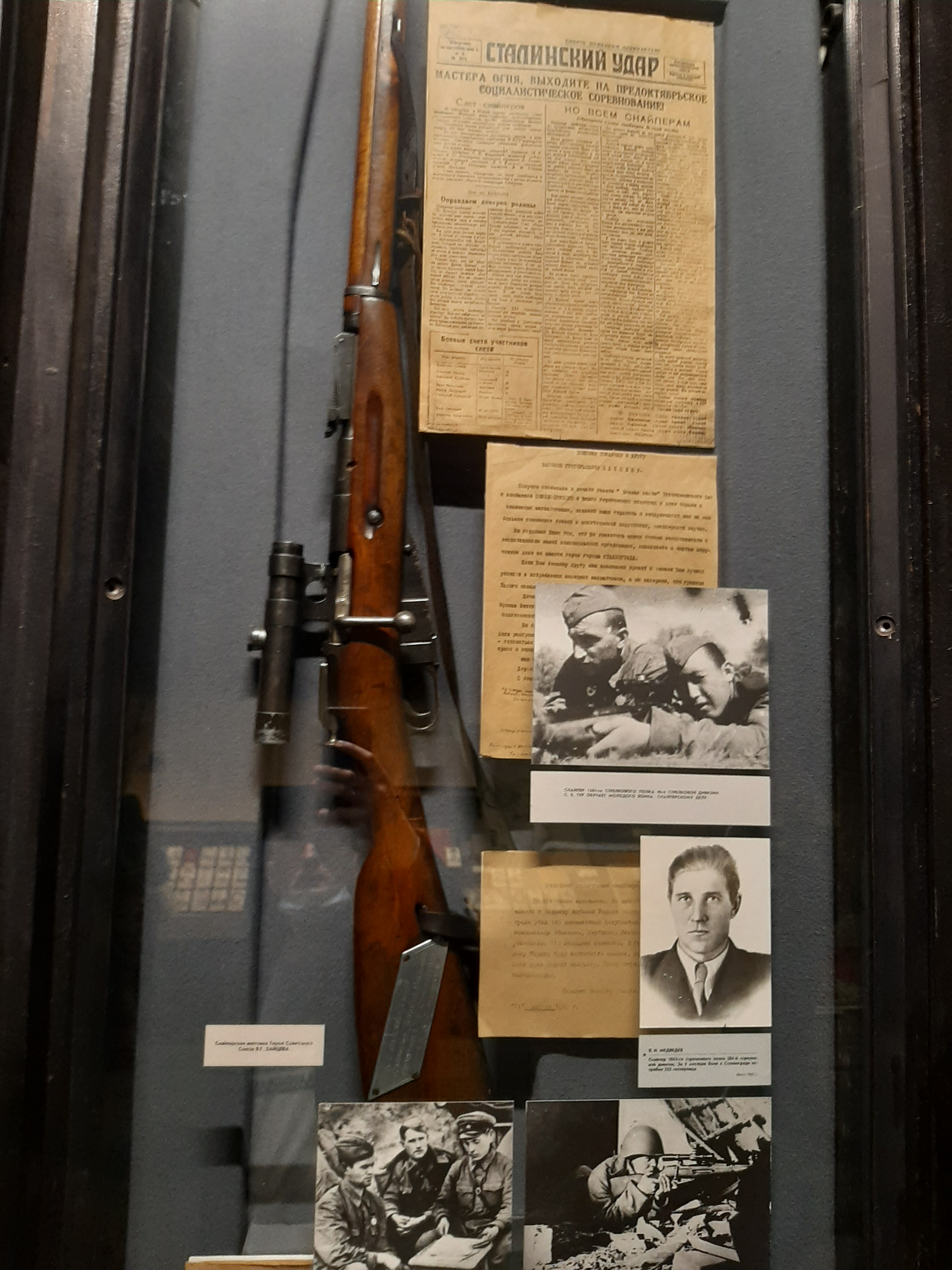
Zaitsev's sniper rifle, a 7.62×54mmR Mosin Model 1891/30 sniper rifle with a PU 3.5× sniper scope on display at the Volgograd's Stalingrad Panorama Museum.

Zaitsev was serving in the Soviet Navy as a clerk in Vladivostok when Germany invaded the Soviet Union in Operation Barbarossa. Like many of his comrades, he volunteered for transfer to the front line. He had attained the rank of chief petty officer in the Navy and was assigned the rank of senior warrant officer upon transfer to the army. He was assigned to the 1047th Rifle Regiment of the 284th "Tomsk" Rifle Division, which became part of the 62nd Army at Stalingrad on 17 September 1942.

Zaitsev's accuracy with a rifle led to him becoming a sniper. Zaitsev would conceal himself in various locations, for example on high ground, under rubble, or in water pipes. After a few kills, he would change his position or relocate. Together with his partner, Nikolai Kulikov, Zaitsev perfected his hide and sting tactics. One method was to cover a large area from three positions, with two men at each point – a sniper and a scout. This tactic, known as the "sixes", is still in use today by Russian forces and was implemented during the Chechen wars.

Zaitsev fought at the Battle of Stalingrad until January 1943, when a mortar attack injured his eyes. Some conflicting stories state it was a landmine, but the doctor who treated Zaitsev and eventually restored his eyesight was ophthalmologist Vladimir Filatov, founder of the Institute of Eye Diseases and Tissue Therapy in Odessa, and a pioneer in corneal transplantation. Had Zaitsev been injured by a landmine, an ophthalmologist would not have treated him. According to Soviet sources, before his injury he had killed 265 people in the Battle of Stalingrad alone.

On 22 February 1943, Zaitsev was awarded the title Hero of the Soviet Union. Zaitsev recruited and trained other marksmen during his service in Stalingrad. He returned to the front, and finished the war at the Battle of the Seelow Heights in Germany, with the rank of captain. He became a member of the All-Union Communist Party (Bolsheviks) in 1943.

== Civilian life ==
After the war, Zaitsev settled in Kiev (now Kyiv), where he studied at a textile university before obtaining employment as an engineer. He rose to become the director of a textile factory, where he remained until his death on 15 December 1991 in Kiev, at the age of 76, just 11 days before the dissolution of the Soviet Union. He was buried in Kiev, although he wished to be buried in the Stalingrad that he had defended.

== 2006 commemoration ==
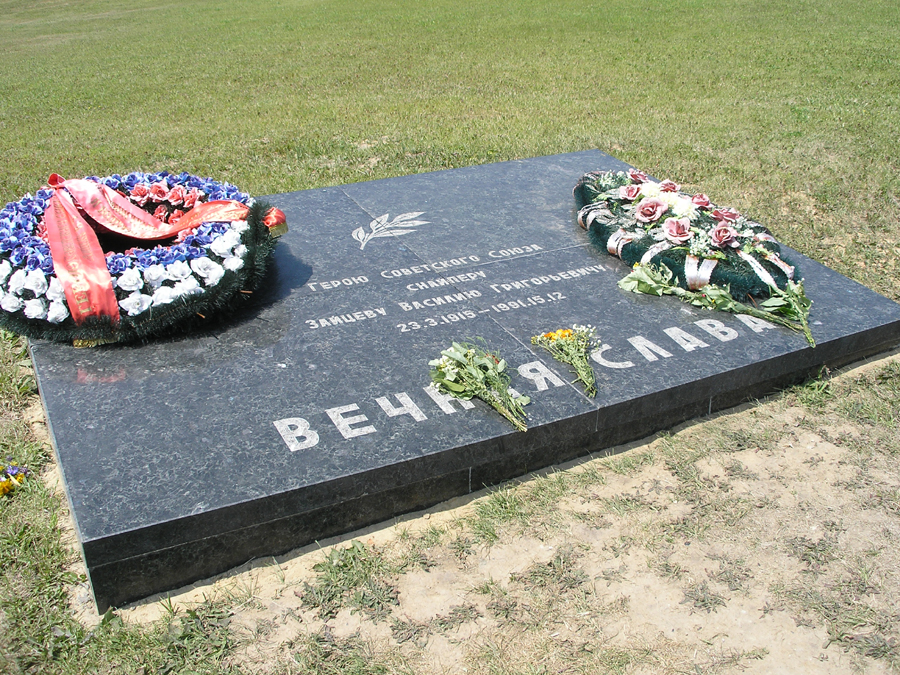
Zaitsev's grave at Mamayev Kurgan in Volgograd

On 31 January 2006, Vasily Zaitsev was reburied with full military honors at the Stalingrad memorial at Mamayev Kurgan in Volgograd, Russia.

== In popular culture ==
=== Film ===
A feature-length film, Enemy at the Gates (2001), starring Jude Law as Zaitsev, was based on part of William Craig's book Enemy at the Gates: The Battle for Stalingrad (1973), which includes a "snipers' duel" between Zaitsev and a Wehrmacht sniper school director, Major Erwin König. Zaitsev indicates in his own memoirs that a three-day duel did indeed occur and that the sniper he killed was the head of a sniper school near Berlin; however, historian Sir Antony Beevor states that the Russian Ministry of Defence archives contradict this and that the duel had been created by the Soviet propaganda. Russian researcher Oleg Kaminsky suggests that the duel could have been between Zaitsev and the German corporal Hermann Stoff of the 295th Infantry Division, who was responsible for 103 killed Red Army soldiers and commanders and who died in Stalingrad at this time.

=== Literature ===
David L. Robbins's historical novel War of the Rats (1991) includes a sniper duel in Stalingrad, but between Zaitsev and a German adversary named Colonel Heinz Thorvald, identified in the author's introduction as an actual combatant. Ramón Rosanas wrote a comic about the conflict between Zaitsev and König.

== Awards and honors ==
- Hero of the Soviet Union
- Four Orders of Lenin
- Two Orders of the Red Banner
- Order of the Patriotic War 1st Class
- Medal "For Courage"
- Honorary Citizen of the Hero City of Volgograd (Stalingrad)
