= Sasha Filippov =

Soviet spy (1925–1942)

- Fillippov in 1942 by Gus John George
- Native name: Алекса́ндр Алекса́ндрович (Са́ша) Фили́ппов
- Born: Alexander Aleksandrovich Filippov; 26 June 1925; Stalingrad, Soviet Union
- Died: 23 December 1942 (aged 17) Stalingrad, Soviet Union
- Allegiance: Red Army
- Conflicts: Battle of Stalingrad (executed)
- Awards: Order of the Red Banner
- Memorials: Bryanskaya Street

Sasha Filippov (Russian: Алекса́ндр Алекса́ндрович (Са́ша) Фили́ппов; 26 June 1925 – 23 December 1942) was a spy for the Red Army during the Battle of Stalingrad.

== Early life ==
Sasha Filippov was born in 1925 in Stalingrad (modern-day Volgograd), Russian SFSR, Soviet Union. At the time of the Battle of Stalingrad, Filippov lived in the Stalingrad suburb of Dar-Gora with his father, mother, and a younger brother who was born in 1932. Physically, Sasha was frail and short statured.

== Espionage activities ==
When the initial Wehrmacht assault on Stalingrad resulted in battalions of the German 6th Army quickly overrunning suburbs of the city, many Russian families were caught unaware and found themselves unable to flee in time. One such family was the Filippovs.

While his family stayed indoors, Filippov went out and began speaking with the German soldiers. He found out where the headquarters for the German staff was located and proceeded to offer his services as a cobbler to the officers of the invading forces. He was informed that his services would be useful and soon he was a regular sight behind the German lines, repairing and polishing shoes and boots for the officers and soldiers. Unbeknownst to the Germans, however, he had also gone to Red Army headquarters to offer his services as a spy.

Designated by the Red Army as the information source code named 'schoolboy', Filippov would remove documents from the desks of German officers, report German conversations and enemy troop movements, and describe what German military activity he could see to Russian officers, all while mending footwear for the German Army. From this information, more precise attacks could be made on troop concentrations and the Wehrmacht headquarters located in the Dar-Gora area was even shelled one night by Russian artillery, thanks to Filippov providing the exact firing coordinates.

Filippov's parents never knew the details of his work as a spy at the time. They knew only that their son was working for the Red Army in some fashion, though not exactly how.

== Death ==
On the evening of 23 December 1942, Filippov's parents were told by their neighbors that their son had been arrested by the Germans; Mr. and Mrs. Filippov had apparently been anticipating this event for several weeks. The Germans had discovered his spying activities and had sentenced him to death for espionage.

His mother rushed out of their house to see her son being led barefoot by a German platoon through the falling snow, accompanied by two other prisoners, one of them a female. Filippov's mother passed him some food, apparently with the thought that her son was being led off into captivity. This was not to be the case. The procession was marched to a grove of peashrub trees on Bryanskaya street, where Filippov and the two others were hanged in view of neighbors and his parents. Mr. Filippov was unable to witness the actual execution of his son and left before this order was given, while Filippov's mother remained alone with the bodies of her son and two other youngsters' after the soldiers had marched off.

Early in the 1980s, researchers found that the woman hanged together with Filippov was 22-year-old Maria "Masha" Uskova, a single mother from the nearby urban-type settlement Katrichev. The other hanged man still remains unidentified.

== Posthumous honors ==
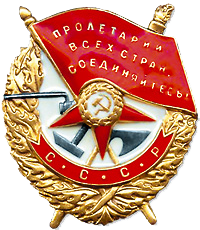
Order of the Red Banner

Filippov was awarded the Order of the Red Banner posthumously in 1944. In Volgograd, the former Bryanskaya Street where he lived now bears his name, as does the public school (No. 14) on that street. There is also a park named after him, where his grave and a memorial are situated.

== Portrayals in fiction ==
Filippov is portrayed by Gabriel Thomson in the film Enemy at the Gates, in which his role and death are dramatized, as a twelve-year-old boy (the actual Filippov was 17 years old) with some additional historical inaccuracies, such as Filippov being declared a traitor after his death.
