= 284th Rifle Division =

- Active: 1941–1945
- Country: Soviet Union
- Branch: Red Army
- Type: Division
- Role: Infantry
- Engagements: Operation Barbarossa; Battle of Kiev (1941); Operation Blue; Battle of Stalingrad; Operation Ring; Soviet invasion of Manchuria
- Decorations: Order of the Red Banner (2nd Formation)
- Battle honours: Khingan (3rd Formation)

Commanders
- Notable commanders: Col. Gennady Petrovich Pankov; Col. Nikolai Filippovich Batyuk; Col. Vasily Stepanovich Elikhov; Col. Aslan Usupovich Badzhelidze

The 284th Rifle Division began service as a standard Red Army rifle division shortly after the German invasion. Moved to the front soon after, it helped defend the Soviet lines west of the Ukrainian capital for more than a month, but was then destroyed in the encirclement of Kiev. A new division was formed in early 1942. It served in the early fighting against the German summer offensive of 1942 until its losses forced it to be withdrawn for rebuilding. In September it was redeployed, and played a leading role in defending the northern part of the central city and Mamayev Kurgan hill in the Battle of Stalingrad, and later in the reduction of the trapped German 6th Army during Operation Ring, for which it was raised to Guards status as the 79th Guards Rifle Division shortly after the battle ended. A third 284th was raised a few months later. It served on the quiet fronts of the Far East for most of the rest of the war before fighting briefly against the Japanese in Manchuria in August, 1945. The unit continued to serve well into the postwar period under other designations.

== First formation ==
The division began forming on July 10, 1941, at Romny in the Kharkov Military District. The commanding officer, Col. Gennady Petrovich Pankov, was appointed the same day; he would lead the division throughout its 1st Formation. Its basic order of battle was as follows:

- 1043rd Rifle Regiment
- 1045th Rifle Regiment
- 1047th Rifle Regiment
- 820th Artillery Regiment.
- 338th Separate Medical Battalion
- 334th Separate Anti-Tank Battalion
- 353rd Separate Reconnaissance Company
- 589th Separate Engineer Battalion
- 754th Separate Communications Battalion
- 387th Separate Chemical Defense Company
- 724th Motor Transport Company
- 430th Field Bakery
- 895th Veterinary Hospital
- 1691st Field Postal Station
- 614th Field Cash Office

Just three weeks after forming the 284th was railed to the Kiev Defense Sector. By August 12 it was assigned to 37th Army of Southwestern Front, and helped to defend the direct approaches to Kiev for the next month, but this left it hopelessly trapped when the German forces linked up far east of Kiev in September. The division was effectively destroyed later that month, although it was not officially removed from the Soviet order of battle until December 27.

== Second formation ==
On December 15 a new rifle division, the 443rd, began forming at Tomsk in the Siberian Military District. Kombrig Sergei Aleksandrovich Ostroumov was given command on that date. On January 27, 1942 it was re-designated as the new 284th Rifle Division. With most of its personnel of Siberian origin, it became known unofficially as the "Tomsk" division, although there were also large numbers of men from Novosibirsk and Kemerovo as well. Its order of battle remained the same as the 1st Formation.

=== Operation Blue ===
The unit spent about three months in training in Siberia before being sent to the front. On February 27, Col. Nikolai Filippovich Batyuk took command, which he would hold for the remainder of the 2nd Formation. The division was assigned to the new 48th Army in Bryansk Front. When Operation Blue began on June 28 it had not yet arrived in that Army, and was under direct command of the Front. In the first two days of the offensive a gap about 40 km wide and 35–40 km deep was torn in the Front's defenses by the 4th Panzer Army. As a fresh unit, the 284th was ordered into the gap, along with the 1st Destroyer (Antitank) Division, to set up an all-around defense at Kastornoye. By June 30 the two divisions were defending the town with "exceptional stubbornness". On July 3 they came under further attack from 9th Panzer Division, which elected to bypass to the south of the position, forcing the Soviet units to withdraw northeastwards to avoid encirclement. However, even with more antitank assets on hand than usual, the 284th took considerable losses during its retreat. By July 14 it regained the Soviet lines northwest of Voronezh. Within days it was subordinated to Operational Group Chibisov, which was formed from assets of Bryansk Front under command of the Front's deputy commander, Maj. Gen. Nikandr Evlampievich Chibisov. The plan was for this Group to attack the German 2nd Army in a salient west of Voronezh. It was intended to begin on July 17 but in the event was put back to the 21st.

The division was in a very poor condition to support this offensive. On July 20 division commissar Tkachenko reported its state as follows:

"In the division there are 3,172 military servicemen; a batch of replacements numbering 1,312 men has arrived and another 2,000... are expected, but in the division there are only a total of 1,921 rifles, 98 [semi-]automatic rifles and 202 PPSh submachine guns... There are 21 motorized vehicles in the division, but according to the shtat [Table of Organization and Equipment] there should be 114. There are just 7 heavy machine guns, but according to the shtat 108 are necessary. 47 light machine guns, but according to the shtat there should be 350. 36 anti-tank rifles, but 277 according to the shtat. The division's separation from its supply base extends up to 100 kilometres and aggravates the supply [of] food."

The commissar went on to urgently request vehicles (including ambulances, of which there were none), small arms and support weapons, draught horses, and a closer supply base. After the first day of fighting Tkachenko further reported that the lack of high-explosive shells forced the artillery to fire armor-piercing rounds at enemy firing points and troops; there were no cartridges for the submachine guns; many of the men's uniforms and footwear were worn out; and it was impossible to commit the replacements into the fighting because of the lack of weapons. The 284th was the right-flank division of the Group; 340th Rifle Division was on its left. On July 21 the division, stretched over a wide sector and with no armor support, made no progress at all, and was accused by the commander of the 340th of failing to attack. On the following day, as the 340th began to make some progress southwards, it became more difficult to keep contact with the 284th. General Chibisov decided to solve the problem by committing his fresh reserve 237th Rifle Division, backed by the 201st Tank Brigade, into the gap. Beginning its attack on the morning of July 23, the commander of the 237th later complained of getting no support from its flanking units, and that some of the 284th had even pulled back. By the next day the Germans had brought in their backstop, the 9th Panzer Division, directly threatening the green 237th. Colonel Batyuk, watching the armor deploying from a distance, noted its openly intimidating nature, observing, "All of the enemy's actions were designed to affect morale." He further reported:

"At 0800 the 237th Rifle Division, without offering any resistance [underlined in original text], was fleeing in the direction of Kamenka, completely exposing the left flank and rear of the 284th... and made no attempts to regain its lines or to render fire support. The units of the 284th... were continuing to hold their occupied line... Only by 1400 was the left flank pushed back to a line along the southwestern outskirts of Ozerki under the onslaught of a large number of enemy tanks and enemy motorized infantry... The 1045th Rifle Regiment... by the end of the day fell back to [this] line.

Batyuk reported losses of 20 men killed, more than 150 wounded, and 16 missing in action, plus three guns damaged and under repair. He also reported around 14 knocked-out or burned-out German tanks in front of his positions.

Just after midnight on July 25 Batyuk was ordered to go on the attack once again at 0500, but this effort again made little impression. The division tried again on the 26th, and gained a little ground towards Spasskoe before being forced back to its start line. This was its last attempt; the division's ranks were extremely thin, although morale remained strong. On July 29 the offensive ended, and within days the 284th was pulled from the line, arriving in Sverdlovsk in early August for rebuilding. A large number of the needed replacements were recruited locally, but the division also received several thousand sailors from the Pacific Fleet.

=== Defense of Stalingrad ===
On August 31 the restored division was in 4th Reserve Army, located 250–350 km northwest of Stalingrad. Less than ten days earlier, the first forces of German 6th Army had reached the Volga River north of the city. On September 17 the division was assigned to 62nd Army and began arriving on the east bank, its first elements crossing the Volga in the early morning of the 21st. The 284th's initial assignment would be to fill the gap between the 95th Rifle Division, which had begun crossing the day before and was responsible for the defense of Mamayev Kurgan, and the 13th Guards Rifle Division, which had been desperately defending the city center over the past few days. Although the division was back up to a strength of about 10,000 men, it was still lacking weapons, and on arrival only the 1043rd Rifle Regiment was completely equipped, so it was the first to cross. It was briefly held in reserve, before moving forward to relieve the exhausted troops of the 112th Rifle Division from Mamayev Kurgan to the Krutoi Ravine. On September 22, two regiments of the German 295th Infantry Division pierced the defenses of the 112th and reached the west bank of the Volga at several points "after difficult fighting." Later in the day the now-armed 1047th and 1045th Rifle Regiments arrived in time to drive back these tenuous footholds.

Col. N.F. Batyuk (holding the phone) in his headquarters with members of his staff

It was the intention of Lt. Gen. Vasili Ivanovich Chuikov, commander of 62nd Army, to counterattack the German positions with his newly arrived forces, but these efforts came to very little. By the end of the day on September 25, the 284th reported a total strength of 7,648 men. It was deployed as follows: "1047th Rifle Regiment is along the northern bank of the Krutoi Ravine, with its right flank anchored on the line of the railroad to Artemovskaia Street. 1043rd Rifle Regiment is fighting along the (incl.) Artemovskaia Street line, with its left flank at the line of the railroad to the northern bank of the ravine (east of Nekrasovskaia Street). The 1045th Rifle Regiment is in the army's reserve." The division would remain in this general area, between the central city core and the main factory district, for the remainder of the battle.

6th Army renewed its offensive on September 27, now driving on the factory district, but also attempting to clear Mamayev Kurgan on the way. 95th Rifle Division was badly hit by the relatively fresh 100th Jäger Division and lost most of the hill. Meanwhile, the 100th Jäger's 369th Croatian Regiment joined with the 516th Regiment of the 295th Division to assault the defenses of the 1045th Regiment southeast of the hill, penetrate into the "Tennis Racquet" region and seize the Meat Combine (abattoir). The remaining regiments of the 295th were to attack eastwards along the Dolgii and Krutoi Ravines, crush the 1043rd and 1047th Regiments, and reach the Volga, cutting 62nd Army in half. Stiff and often fanatical resistance by all three regiments stopped these drives well short of their goals. The division lost about 300 men killed or wounded during the day.

The 95th Rifle Division, supported by two battalions of the 1045th Regiment and massive air strikes by 8th Air Army, counterattacked Mamayev Kurgan on September 29 and retook the survey marker near the crest, although they were stopped short of the water tank at the very top. Apart from this, the rest of the division was deployed abreast from north to south, defending a strip of land from the south slope of the Kurgan to its left boundary with 13th Guards. This all came at a cost, and by the evening of October 1 the 284th was reduced to a strength of 3,496 men. On October 3 a renewed attack by the 295th Infantry drove the forces of the 95th and 284th off the north slope of the hill and back through the Military Clothing Factory to positions on the south bank of the Bannyi Ravine. However, similar attacks against the main positions of the division made no progress; the 295th had also taken many losses. For several days a lull in the fighting set in, and on October 9 the 284th was ordered to occupy the sector held by two regiments of the 95th so they could be redeployed to the factory district. During this time the division received replacements and men returned from hospitals and aid stations, and on October 10 reported a strength of 5,907 men, making it the second-strongest division in 62nd Army after 13th Guards, which was being replenished by the same means.

Lt. Gen. V.I. Chuikov (left), commander of 62nd Army, and Lt. Gen. K.A. Gurov, army commissar, examine Sgt. V.G. Zaitsev's sniper rifle.

During October, a senior sergeant of the 2nd Battalion, 1047th Rifle Regiment, Vasili Grigorievich Zaitsev, was brought to Colonel Batyuk's attention. Zaitsev was one of the replacements transferred from the Pacific Fleet in August and was gaining a reputation as a highly effective sharpshooter with the standard Mosin–Nagant rifle. Batyuk recommended him for sniper training, and later ordered him to set up a sniper training school of his own. Before being wounded in January, 1943, Zaitsev was credited with an estimated 300 kills, and became a Hero of the Soviet Union in March. The German offensive was renewed on October 17 in the factory district, and as a result of the 308th and 138th Rifle Divisions falling back near the Barrikady Factory, General Chuikov was forced to relocate his headquarters to a bunker south of the Bannyi Ravine, about 800 metres east of the 284th's front line trenches. It would remain in this position for the duration of the battle. On October 20 Chuikov reinforced a counterattack towards the Barrikady with a battalion of the 1043rd Regiment; he now enjoyed some flexibility in employing his scant reserves. In his after action report on October 24, Chuikov reported:

"At the end of the day, we were told that the command post of the 1045th Regiment had been destroyed by a direct hit from a bomb. The Commander of the regiment, Lieutenant Colonel Timoshin, had been killed."

An advance by the 14th Panzer Division in the Khvost Ravine south of the Barrikady on October 27 threatened the ferry landing where the 45th Rifle Division was crossing the Volga. Chuikov had to build a counterattack force from staff and rear services, 30 men recently discharged from aid stations, and three patched-up tanks to retake lost ground. Meanwhile, the 6th Company of 1045th Regiment reinforced the defenses of the 193rd Rifle Division's 895th Regiment along Dolinskaya and Umanskaia Streets. On November 1 the main body of the 284th continued to hold its primary position, a front 3,600 metres wide and from 100 – 800 metres deep, the deepest frontage now that the 6th Army held 90 percent of the city. Since this sector was not under German attack in November, the division contributed with assault groups which attacked enemy pillboxes and dugouts, especially at night. It also repulsed an attack up the Bannyi Ravine by a company of enemy infantry on November 10. On the same day, two battalions of the 92nd Rifle Brigade crossed the Volga into the 284th's sector to join the 1043rd Regiment in second echelon; Chuikov feared a major German attack on the Chemical Factory, which never occurred.

In the following days German 6th Army made what turned out to be its final bid for the factory district. The Krasnyi Oktiabr plant was mostly in German hands, and Batyuk was ordered "to allocate part of its 1043rd Regiment to relieve the left wing battalion of 112th [Guards] Regiment (39th Guards Rifle Division) on the night of November 12–13 and prepare its sector for a firm defense." By the end of the 13th, the division probably had no more than 1,200 men remaining on the west bank, although the official total reported by 62nd Army on November 20 was 4,696. That last date is significant, as the day previous the Soviet forces outside the city began Operation Uranus.

=== Operation Uranus ===
Lt. Gen. V.I. Chuikov and Col. N.F. Batyuk observe the battlefield, December, 1942

Chuikov was under orders to continue to take the fight to the enemy so as to assist the counterattacking forces outside. On November 21, the 1047th and 1045th Regiments, supported by part of the 92nd Rifle Brigade, launched an attack at 1400 which retook the crest of Mamayev Kurgan from 100th Jäger Division. Further attacks on the next day again failed to take the water tank. On the 23rd the assault on the hill made only minor gains, as did an attack towards the Krasnyi Oktiabr. After a break of 24 hours, the best the division could do on the Kurgan was to improve its positions slightly. On November 29 the 284th lost 105 men killed or wounded in similar efforts; furthermore the 62nd Army was suffering severe shortages of supplies due to the partly frozen Volga, and on the 30th it was finally ordered to go over to the defense.

Further attacks on the hill took place on December 3. On that day, 295th Infantry Division reported 78 casualties, but the 284th made no significant gains in territory and was now down to an estimated strength of 1,500 men. The fighting was halted once again until December 14, when the division struck again, this time at 100th Jäger, with similar results. On the 28th a larger effort was ordered, involving the 45th Rifle, 39th Guards Rifle, and 284th Rifle Divisions, plus 92nd Rifle Brigade, to drive the Germans off the hill and away from the Krasnyi Oktiabr and the southern half of its workers' settlement area. This failed to reach its goals, but made gains against a weakened enemy.

=== Operation Ring ===
During the first ten days of January, 1943, the 284th, along with the divisions and brigade above, and later joined by 95th Rifle Division, made preparations for Operation Ring, the reduction of the German pocket. This involved reconnaissance, seizing and holding individual buildings, and destroying enemy firing points and bunkers. Also during this period Chuikov redeployed the 348th MG-Artillery Battalion of the 156th Fortified Region into the city along the Dolgii Ravine between the 284th and 13th Guards; this allowed Batyuk's troops to consolidate on a shorter line. When Ring began on January 10 the division's specific mission was to attack with all three rifle regiments abreast to take Mamayev Kurgan and destroy the enemy units there. In the event, although the water tank was finally taken, the desperate German defenses held.

Over the next few days, further transfers from 156th Fortified Region allowed 13th Guards to redeploy northwards onto the right flank of the 284th. By nightfall on January 17, additional gains had expanded the area of 62nd Army's bridgehead in the city by about 50 percent. A lull set in over the next few days, but on January 22 Chuikov ordered his men back to the attack, but again only limited gains were made. The final act began on January 26, when Don Front renewed its offensive along its entire line. The 284th and 13th Guards were carefully briefed with recognition signals and radio call signs to secure a smooth link-up with 21st Army, which came at 1100 on the 284th's sector. The German pocket was now cut in two, and the division was assigned to help reduce the south pocket. Attacking alongside the 52nd Guards Rifle Division of 21st Army on the 28th the men of the 284th drove their old foes of the 295th and 100th Jäger Divisions back to the southern bank of Dolgii Ravine.

On January 30 the division, now together with 173rd Rifle Division, pressed southward towards the northern part of the city's center. An advance of more than a kilometre broke the back of the 295th's defenses and penetrated to the northern edge of 9th January Square and the western end of Solnechnaia Street. On the 31st the 284th captured the square and linked up with troops of 64th Army. On the same day, Field Marshal Friedrich Paulus surrendered his 6th Army, but the north pocket continued to hold out. Showing remarkable stamina, the division rejoined 62nd Army to join its attack there on February 1. It teamed up with 45th Rifle Division and the 34th Guards Regiment of 13th Guards, and was reinforced with engineer tanks and an antitank regiment, with the objective to seize the worker's village of the Barrikady factory, and then into the rear of Bread Factory No. 2. As so often before, the gains made that day were minimal, but it made little difference as the German forces in the pocket laid down their arms on the morning of February 2. While most of the divisions of 62nd Army were transferred in the next few weeks, the 284th (soon redesignated 79th Guards Rifle Division) would remain in 62nd Army (soon redesignated 8th Guards Army) for the duration of the war and into the postwar era.

General Chuikov acknowledged the performance of the 284th as among the best in his Army, and also had rough praise for Batyuk:

"To be honest, most of the divisional commanders didn't really want to die in Stalingrad. The second something went wrong, they'd start saying: 'Permit me to cross the Volga.' I would yell 'I'm still here'... [But] Batyuk and Sokolov [45th Rifle Division] behaved wonderfully... I very rarely had to [speak sharply] with Rodimtsev, Batyuk, and Guryev [39th Guards Rifle Division].

Following the surrender of 6th Army, on February 8 the division was awarded the Order of the Red Banner for "exemplary fulfillment of command tasks" and its "valor and courage". On March 1, in further recognition of the division's prowess both on the defense and during the offensive that crushed the trapped German force, it was redesignated as the 79th Guards Rifle Division.

== Third formation ==
The final 284th Rifle Division was one of six new divisions formed in the Transbaikal in July, 1943. Its order of battle remained the same as the first two formations. Col. Vasilii Stepanovich Elikhov was assigned to command on July 15. It served in the Transbaikal Front, in 17th Army, for the duration. Colonel Elikhov was replaced by Col. Aslan Usupovich Badzhelidze on April 21, 1945. When the Soviet Union declared war on Japan on August 9, 1945, the division joined in the advance into Manchuria. This advance was mostly unopposed, and this formation of the 284th saw very little, if any, combat. For its efforts, the division was awarded the honorific Khingan. In October, 1945, the division became the 14th Mechanized Division at Nerchinsk, part of the 6th Guards Tank Army. On June 4, 1957, it was redesignated as the 89th Motor Rifle Division.

== In popular culture ==
- Colonel Batyuk, Senior Sergeant Zaitsev, and several other men of the 284th appear briefly (Part One, Chapter 55) in Vasily Grossman's novel Life and Fate. Grossman had actually interviewed both Batyuk and Zaitsev during the Battle of Stalingrad.
- Viktor Nekrasov's novel Front-Line Stalingrad (Harvill Press, 1962) is based on his experiences fighting as a junior officer in the 284th at Stalingrad.
- William Craig's history of the Battle of Stalingrad, Enemy at the Gates: The battle for Stalingrad was published by Penguin Books in 1973. It was one of the first mass-market books in the English language to give details of the Battle of Stalingrad, including some history of the 284th.
- David L. Robbins' novel, War of the Rats, (Bantam Books, New York, 1999) is a fictionalized account of Vasili Zaitsev's experiences in the Battle of Stalingrad, including his possible battle with a German sniper, Major Erwin König.
- The 2001 film, Enemy at the Gates, is mostly based on Robbins' novel.
