= Yeleninka =

Populated place in Chelyabinsk Oblast, Russia

Coordinates: 53°07′N 59°53′E

Yeleninka (Еленинка), also known as Yeleninsky (Еленинский) and Yeleninskoye (Еле́нинское), is a rural locality (a selo) in Kartalinsky District of Chelyabinsk Oblast, Russia.

It is the birthplace of Vasily Zaytsev, the famous World War II Soviet sniper.
