= Last Letters from Stalingrad =

German anthology published 1950

- Original title: Letzte Briefe aus Stalingrad
- Translator: Anthony G. Powell
- Language: German
- Publication date: 1950
- Publication place: West Germany
- English publication date: 1956

Last Letters from Stalingrad (German: Letzte Briefe aus Stalingrad) is an anthology of letters from German soldiers who took part in the Battle for Stalingrad during World War II. Originally published in West Germany in 1950, the book was translated into many languages (into English by Anthony G. Powell in 1956), and has been issued in numerous editions.

The German High Command wished to gauge the morale of the troops of the encircled 6th Army, so they allowed the soldiers to write and send the letters which became the basis for Last Letters from Stalingrad. The letters were then impounded, opened, stripped of identification and sorted by content, before eventually being stored in archives.

Unlike the usual military history accounts focusing on mass armies of anonymous men, the reader is presented with the personal tragedies of individual soldiers, the "single human being ... in the face of death", getting a tangible impression of the horrors of war. The letters are a "human document which bares the soul of the man at his worst hour", and by softening the identification of Germany with Nazism the book helped Germany to take its place in the Western post-war community of nations.

French president François Mitterrand supposedly carried the French edition with him in the last months of his life, and drew inspiration from it in writing his speech for the 50th anniversary of the end of the war on the 8 May 1995.

== Questioned authenticity ==
German jurist and legal scholar Wilhelm Raimund Beyer has questioned the authenticity of the letters based on the textual style and his own experiences during the Battle of Stalingrad. The historian Jens Ebert has accused the former German war reporter of Propagandakompanie 637 attached to the 6th Army during the war Heinz Schröter to have written the book.

The letters refuse to admit the complete hopelessness of the 6th Army, and in fact (cited from letters never to be delivered, either pulled from corpses or retained by advancing Soviet troops), even the German Luftwaffe were being mauled by inadequate Soviet fighter planes.

== Adaptations ==
The book inspired two works of contemporary music theater: a chamber music piece by New York composer Elias Tanenbaum, and the 1998 Symphonie No.10 "Letzte Briefe aus Stalingrad" of French composer Aubert Lemeland, a collage of music and recitation.

== See also ==
- Battle of Stalingrad in popular culture
