= 89th Motor Rifle Division =

Motor rifle division of the Soviet military

- Active: I Formation: 1957–1958 II Formation: 1966–1987
- Country: Soviet Union
- Branch: Soviet Army
- Type: Motorized infantry
- Garrison/HQ: Tambov (II Formation)
- Battle honours: Khingan (I Formation)

The 89th Motor Rifle Division was a motor rifle division of the Soviet Army, formed twice. The division was first formed in 1957 from the 14th Mechanized Division, which was the former 284th Rifle Division (3rd formation). In 1966, it was reformed as a mobilization division. In 1987, it became a territorial training center and a storage base soon after. It was disbanded in 1996. The unit was based at Tambov.

== History ==
In 1957, the 89th Motor Rifle Division was formed in the Transbaikal Military District at Dauriya, Chita Oblast. It was formed from the 14th Mechanized Division, the former 284th Rifle Division (3rd formation). It inherited the honorific "Khingan". The division was composed of the 39th, 376th and 379th Motor Rifle Regiments and the 206th Tank Regiment (former 206th Tank Brigade). The division was disbanded on 1 July 1958.

The 89th Motor Rifle Division was reformed on 18 June 1966 at Tambov, part of the 13th Guards Army Corps. It was a mobilisation-only formation with no personnel permanently allocated, and did not inherit the lineage of the previous formation. It would have drawn on small numbers of officers from other units if mobilised, plus reserve callups. It included the 669th, 672nd and 677th Motor Rifle Regiments, the 182nd Separate Reconnaissance Battalion and other units. On 30 November 1967, the 677th became the 385th and was moved to the 243rd Motor Rifle Division. It was replaced by another motor rifle regiment. In September 1987, the division became the 1042nd Territorial Training Center. On 1 October, it became the 5347th Weapons and Equipment Storage Base. In September 1990, the base became part of the 22nd Guards Army. On 19 November 1990, the base was reported as having 187 T-55 tanks. The storage base was disbanded in 1996.
