= Zhambyl Tulaev =

Soviet sniper (1905–1961)

- Жамбыл Ешеевич Тулаев
- Born: 15 May [O.S. 2 May] 1905; Tagarkhai, Irkutsk Governorate, Russian Empire
- Died: 17 January 1961 (aged 55); Tagarkhai, Buryat ASSR, Russian SFSR, Soviet Union
- Military career
- Allegiance: Soviet Union
- Branch: Red Army
- Service years: 1941–1946
- Rank: Lieutenant
- Unit: 580th Infantry Regiment
- Awards: Hero of the Soviet Union

Zhambyl Tulaev (Russian: Жамбыл Тулаев; 15 May [O.S. 2 May] 1905 – 17 January 1961) was a Soviet sniper during World War II who was awarded the title of Hero of the Soviet Union for his first 262 kills. Before the war, he was secretary of the Komsomol committee in his village and served as a commune chairman before undertaking transportation and distribution jobs. He was drafted in September 1941, serving in the infantry and taking part in the fighting on the Eastern Front. After leaving the military in 1946, he worked on collective farms and in the forestry industry. He also served on the Toltoy village council.

== Early life ==
Zhambyl Tulaev was born on 15 May [O.S. 2 May] 1905 to a Buryat family in the Tagarkhai village of Siberia. Despite completing only four grades of primary school, he began working as secretary of the Komsomol committee in his village in 1925, where he remained until 1928. After graduating from courses for commune chairmen, he became the chairman of the Kalinin commune, where he served from January 1929 to March 1932. From October 1933 to September 1937, he worked as a wagon driver, and in 1938 he became head of a shipping container base in Irkutsk.

== World War II ==
Upon being drafted into the Red Army in September 1941, Tulaev was initially assigned to the 582nd Infantry Regiment, based on the Transbaikal Front. In February 1942 he was deployed to the Eastern front with the 580th Infantry Regiment, where he soon started off as a machine gun squad leader but soon switched to being a sniper. He then participated in defensive battles for the Novgorod area; on the night of 2 May 1942 near the village of Prismorzhye he killed 20 enemy soldiers, that were attempting to advance under the cover of heavy artillery fire, covering the evacuation of wounded soldiers.

By the time he was nominated for the title Hero of the Soviet Union in mid-November 1942, his sniper tally had reached 262 enemy soldiers. After graduating from officer training, he received the rank of junior lieutenant in February 1943. He became commander of a rifle platoon upon return to his regiment and went on to fight in the Demyansk operation. In May 1943, he was withdrawn from the front for health reasons and treated in Tver. During his deployment he trained over 30 other snipers, and according to his count killed 313 enemy soldiers.

== Later life ==
Starting in January 1945 he worked for the Tunkinsky military enlistment office. Having officially entered the reserve with the rank lieutenant one year later, he went on to become chairman of a collective farm and later director of a regional forestry project in Kyren village. From 1955 to 1957, he served as deputy chairman of a different collective farm, and from then until he retired for health reasons in 1959 he was chairman of the Toltoy village council. He died less than two years later on 17 January 1961 and was buried in his home village.

== Awards ==
- Hero of the Soviet Union (14 February 1943)
- Order of Lenin (14 February 1943)
- Order of the Red Banner (3 September 1942)
