= Erwin König =

Apocryphal German sniper

Erwin Konig
- Born: Erwin Konig or Heinz Thorvald; Unknown; Germany
- Died: 1943; Stalingrad, Russian SFSR, Soviet Union
- Cause of death: Killed (Most Likely Shot By Vasily Zaitsev)
- Military career
- Allegiance: Nazi Germany
- Branch: Wehrmacht Heer or Waffen-SS
- Service years: Unknown
- Rank: Heer Major (Heer), SS-Sturmbannführer (Waffen-SS)
- Nickname: The Unknown Nazi Sniper
- Conflicts: Battle of Stalingrad

Erwin König might have been a top German sniper killed by Soviet sniper Vasily Zaitsev during the Battle of Stalingrad (1942-43) on the Eastern Front. However, the only mention of him comes from wartime Soviet propaganda and Zaitsev's memoirs. Surviving German military records contain no mention of any similar person.

Issues that König actually existed include whether he was a Wehrmacht officer or a member of the Waffen SS, was his name Erwin König (Konnings) or Heinz Thorvald, or why the best sniper in the German Army cannot be found in any military archives or Wehrmacht personnel files.

== Background ==
According to Notes of a Russian Sniper: Vassili Zaitsev and the Battle of Stalingrad by Vasily Zaitsev, Erwin (Konings) König was reportedly a German Heer Officer in the Wehrmacht (or the Waffen-SS), who was a director at a German sniper school in Berlin. He was ordered to Stalingrad to kill Zaitsev because the Soviet sniper was so good. Following a three-day cat-and-mouse duel through the city's bombed-out ruins, Zaitsev claimed he killed König after he spotted him hiding under iron sheeting near a wrecked tank.

== Historical existence ==
Due to the lack of any German wartime records proving the existence of König and his achievements, there is historical doubt as to whether he existed at all. According to the official Soviet account, the sniper was SS-major Heinz Thorvald who was considered the best sniper in the entire German military. However, this is contradicted by Zaitsev in his owned autobiography, who named him Erwin Konings. The Soviets state König (Konings) was a top sniping instructor who was ordered to Stalingrad to kill Zaitsev once the Germans learned the Red Army was using Zaitsev's kill counts in their propaganda to boost Soviet morale. Their duel is mentioned by author William Craig in his 1973 non-fiction book Enemy at the Gates: The Battle for Stalingrad.

In a post-war visit to Berlin, Zaitsev was allegedly confronted by a woman who told him that she was König's daughter but before any more could be said Zaitsev said he was removed by Soviet handlers to avoid any confrontation.

== In popular culture ==
A fictionalized account of the duel in the film Enemy at the Gates portrays Erwin König—played by Ed Harris—as the head of the Wehrmacht Sniper School for the Wehrmacht’s Heer (ground army). He is sent to Stalingrad to take on the increasingly aggressive Soviet snipers. Initially he is successful, killing four of Zaitsev's partners, but eventually he is outwitted by the Russian, portrayed by Jude Law.

Ramón Rosanas wrote a comic about the conflict between Zaitsev and König.
