= Konchkati, Ozurgeti Municipality =

Konchkati კონჭკათი
- Village
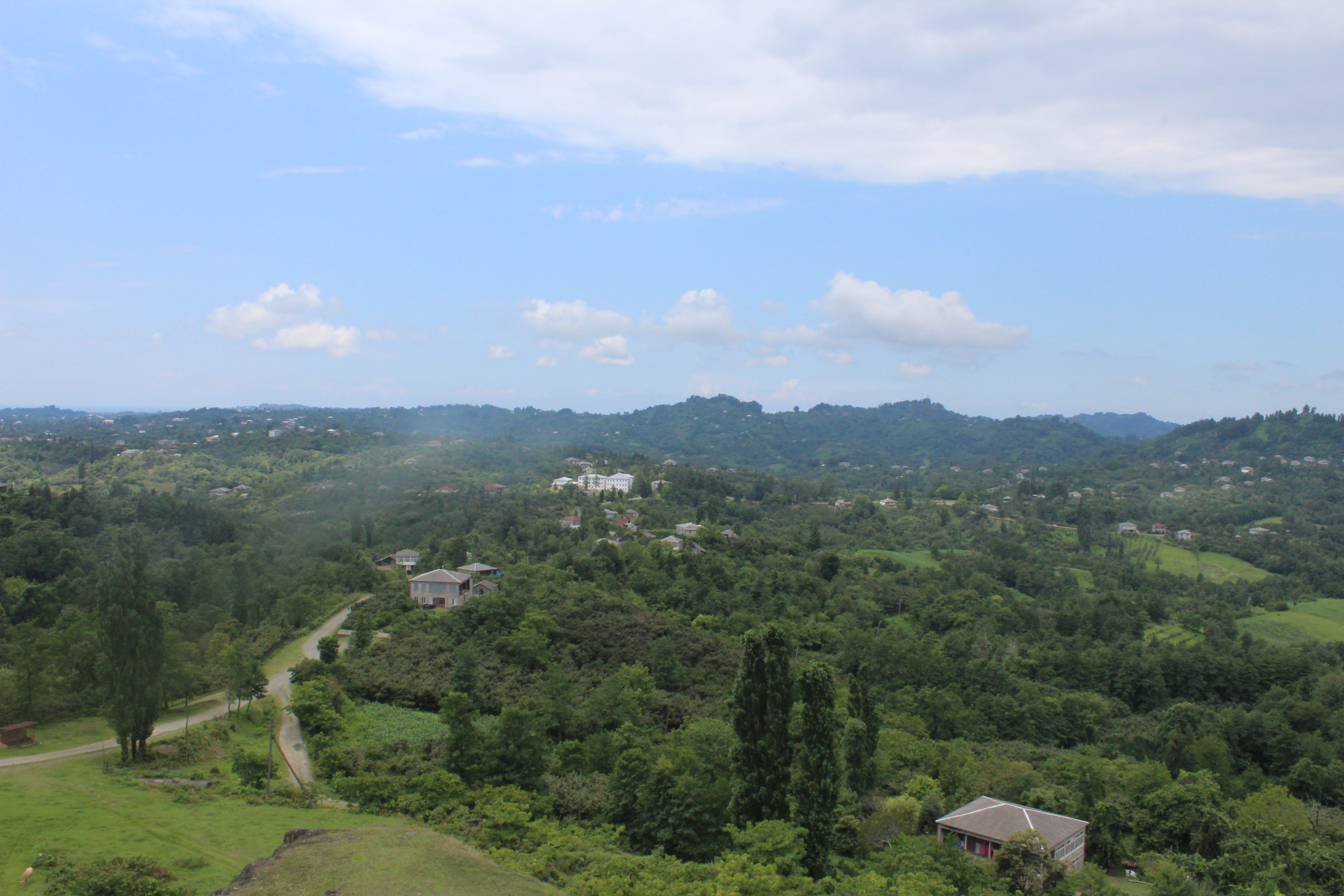

- Location within Georgia Location within Guria
- Coordinates: 41°58′41″N 41°54′17″E
- Country: Georgia
- Mkhare: Guria
- Municipality: Ozurgeti
- Elevation: 120 m (390 ft)

Population (2014)
  - Total: 805
- Time zone: UTC+4 (Georgian Time)

Konchkati (Georgian: კონჭკათი) is a village in the Ozurgeti Municipality of Guria in western Georgia.
