= Katrichev =

Katrichev Катричев
- Settlement
- Location within Volgograd Oblast Location within Russia
- Coordinates: 49°22′N 45°32′E
- Country: Russia
- Region: Volgograd Oblast
- District: Bykovsky District
- Time zone: UTC+4:00

Katrichev (Russian: Катричев) is a rural locality (a settlement) and the administrative center of Uralo-Akhtubinskoye Rural Settlement, Bykovsky District, Volgograd Oblast, Russia. The population was 1,897 as of 2010. There are 28 streets.

== Geography ==
Katrichev is located in Zavolzye, 71 km southeast of Bykovo (the district's administrative centre) by road. Mayak Oktyabrya is the nearest rural locality.
