= Noah Adamia =

Soviet sniper (1917–1942)

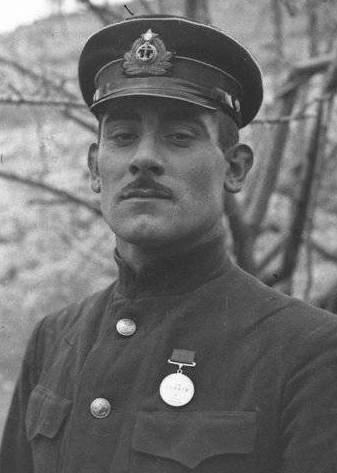
- Native name: ნოე პეტრეს ძე ადამია Ной Адамия
- Born: 21 December 1917; Matkhoji, Transcaucasian Commissariat
- Died: 3 July 1942 (aged 24) Sevastopol, Russian SFSR, Soviet Union
- Allegiance: Soviet Union
- Branch: Soviet Naval Infantry
- Service years: 1938–1942
- Rank: Starshina
- Commands: Sniper instructor, 7th Marine Brigade, North-Caucasian Front; Platoon commander
- Conflicts: World War II; Battle of Sevastopol †
- Awards: Hero of the Soviet Union

Noah Adamia (Georgian: ნოე პეტრეს ძე ადამია, romanized: Noe Petros Dze Adamia; Russian: Ной Петрович Адамия, romanized: Noah Petrovich Adamia; 21 December 1917 – 3 July 1942) was a Soviet sniper and Hero of the Soviet Union who served in the Soviet Maritime Forces during World War II.

He participated in the Sevastopol sniper movement and personally trained about 80 snipers. Adamia is credited with having killed over 200 German soldiers during the Battle of Sevastopol, before he was killed in action a day before the remaining Soviet forces defending the port surrendered.

== Early life ==
Born on 21 December 1917 into a peasant family in the Georgian village of Matkhoji, he attended a high school in Tbilisi. Afterwards Adamia joined the Soviet Navy in 1938 and served in coastal defenses as anti-aircraft gunner. In 1940, he graduated from the Odessa Military Naval School and became platoon commander.

== World War II ==
=== Battle of Sevastopol ===
Having served on the frontlines since 1941, he decided to become active as a sharpshooter, and in 1942 due to his impressive efficiency with the rifle was given instructor status and ordered to train more than 70 marines of the Soviet 7th Marine Brigade stationed in Sevastopol in sniper warfare. He had mastered sharpshooting by himself and was engaged in the most dangerous areas of the district. Within two months he had all candidates prepared for combat. Up until becoming platoon commander, Adamia was credited with having killed more than 200 enemy soldiers and knocking out two enemy tanks. On 21 June 1942, facing encirclement by German troops, the petty officer led a small 11 man strong sniper detachment to break the ring; they succeeded, killing more than 100 enemy soldiers. The fierce battle went on even out of the encirclement.

==== Sniper tactics ====
From December 1941 Adamia became pioneer of the Sevastopol sniper movement. In the beginning his primary targets were enplaced positions but he soon moved on for active hunts using both the Simonov PTRS-41 anti-materiel rifle and the Mosin–Nagant sniper rifle to take out soft and lightly armored targets. To one of the Soviet army newspapers he said:

"German sharpshooters were very good. So I asked myself. Why shouldn't I be able to become a good sharpshooter too?"

Adamia went on describing how he started to learn calculation of range, observing and slowly mastering the effects of humidity and other aspects of shooting from long distance. One day he took point on a tree covered high ground and observed German troops moving around their entrenched positions to keep themselves warm. He was able to take out six targets over a range of 600 m with his Mosin–Nagant and improved his rate each day after, going out for several days with only a loaf of bread and little water. Adamia tried to determine when enemy forces would concentrate on a specific position for example by observing if improvised latrines or similar points were built. Yevgeniy Ivanovich Zhidilov wrote in his book "We defended Sevastopol":

"Noah Adamia - a passionate hunter - had a sharp eye and keen ear. He was able to quietly sneak through forests, mountains and bushes in seemingly most inaccessible places. Donning camouflage cloaks, capturing some rounds of bread and a flask of water, Noah went in the morning on one of the heights at the forefront of defense. Every day the sniper chose a new position. Like a hunter stalking the beast, so Adamia crept to close quarters and beat the Nazis from his sniper rifle without a miss."

==== Death ====
Adamia met his fate a day before Sevastopol fell to Axis forces on 4 July 1942. He was one of the 60,000 Soviet defenders who were not evacuated. On 3 July Adamia was killed in the area of Gasfort, Kamysheva Bay. He was buried in Sevastopol along with 86 soldiers of the 7th Marine Brigade.

== Awards ==
For his outstanding performance and courage in the fight against Nazism and the actions in June 1942, the Presidium of the Supreme Soviet posthumously awarded Adamia with the title Hero of the Soviet Union, the Order of Lenin and the Medal of Valour on 24 July 1942. Due to restrictions on awards for marine servicemen, he was not awarded with higher honors. A street in the city of Sukhumi, Georgia, is named after him.

== See also ==
- List of books, articles and documentaries about snipers
