= Stalingrad (1943 film) =

- Russian: Сталинград
- Directed by: Leonid Varlamov
- Written by: Leonid Varlamov; A. Kuznetsov
- Cinematography: Vladimir Rapoport
- Music by: Gavriil Popov
- Release date: May 14, 1943
- Country: Soviet Union

Stalingrad, (Russian: Сталинград) is a 1943 Soviet documentary film directed by Leonid Varlamov.

== Plot ==
The film illustrates the famous battle of the Red Army with the Germans for Stalingrad.
