= Tsyrendashi Dorzhiev =

Soviet sniper during World War II

- Цырендаши Ринчинович Доржиев
- Born: 1912; Barai Adag, Transbaikal Oblast, Russian Empire
- Died: 3 January 1943 (aged 30–31); Valday, USSR
- Military career
- Allegiance: Soviet Union
- Branch: Red Army
- Service years: 1941–1943
- Rank: Sergeant
- Unit: 645th Infantry Regiment
- Awards: Order of Lenin

Tsyrendashi Rinchinovich Dorzhiev (Russian: Цырендаши Ринчинович Доржиев; 1912 – 3 January 1943) was a Soviet sniper during World War II credited with killing up to 297 Nazi soldiers as well as shooting down a Nazi plane. A skilled marksman prior to his military service, Dorzhiev volunteered for service with the Red Army and reached the rank of sergeant before being mortally wounded and dying of his wounds in early 1943.

== Early life ==
Dorzhiev was born in 1912 to an impoverished Buryat family in the village of Barai Adag, located within present-day Buryatia. He began hunting on the taiga with his father's rifle at the age of 14 and became a skilled tracker and hunter as an adolescent.

== World War II ==
Upon volunteering for the Red Army in 1941 shortly after the German invasion of the Soviet Union, Dorzhiev was initially assigned to delivering food on a horse, much to his disappointment about not being able to use his marksmanship skills on the front. However, he was soon allowed to transfer to a rifle company after explaining to his commanding officer that he wanted to become a sniper because of his previous experience as a marksman. After practicing with a sniper rifle for a day in November 1941 he was given sniper duties, tasked with shooting at German soldiers leaving a dugout. During the intense battle for Simanovo village he was he was credited with killing 48 enemy soldiers and shooting down a Bf 109 on 3 May 1942; later that month he was nominated for an Order of Lenin for having accumulated a tally of 174 kills.

He was soon featured in several Soviet newspapers including Red Star and interviewed by Call to Victory, in which he said in wanted to bring his tally up to 200 by July in addition to training more new snipers, having trained twelve so far. In September he was nominated for the Medal "For Courage" for bringing up his tally to 216 kills. Later that year he visited his home village as part of a front delegation, but shortly after returning to the front he was injured in the battle for Valday on 30 December 1942. He died of his wounds in a field hospital several days later, on 3 January 1943. Accounts differ as to whether his final tally was 270 or 297 enemy soldiers killed.

== Awards ==
- Order of Lenin (16 June 1942)
- Medal "For Courage" (27 September 1942)
