= David L. Robbins (Virginia writer) =

American author

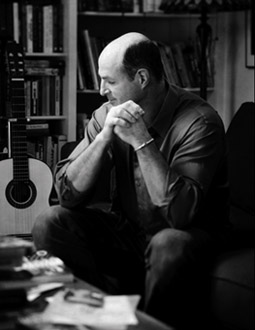
- David L. Robbins
- Born: March 10, 1954 (age 72); Richmond, VA
- Education: The College of William & Mary
- Occupation: Author
- Writing career
- Genre: Historical fiction
- Subject: World War II
- Website: authordavidlrobbins.com

David L. Robbins (born March 10, 1954) is an American author of several historical fiction novels and a co-founder of the James River Writers. He also founded the Richmond-based Podium Foundation. Robbins teaches at the School of the Arts at Virginia Commonwealth University.

== Biography ==
The son of two World War II veterans, David Lea Robbins was born on March 10, 1954, in Richmond, VA. He received his B.A. in Theater and Speech from the College of William and Mary in 1976, then his Juris Doctor from the same school four years later.

He spent one year practicing environmental law in South Carolina then turned to freelance writing. He did not devote his time to writing fiction until 1988 when he discovered the true-life duel between the top Soviet and German snipers at the Battle of Stalingrad. He spent two months traveling in the Soviet Union to research the novel which became his first bestseller in 1999, War of the Rats. With its publication, and his subsequent novels, Robbins was able to become a full-time novelist.

In 2007, Robbins returned to William & Mary, this time as the Writer in Residence. He followed that up with a decade teaching advanced creative writing at the Virginia Commonwealth University (VCU) Honors College. Robbins currently teaches at VCUarts.

Robbins co-founded James River Writers in 2002. The founders and original board included other Richmond writers and members of the literary community, including Dean King, Tom De Haven, and Phaedra Hise, with the mission to encourage creative expression in the Richmond area. Since its founding, the nonprofit organization has held literary contests, newsletters, and a yearly conference as well as exposing readers to contemporary authors who come to speak.

Robbins became interested in creating opportunities for underserved students in Richmond Public Schools through creative expression and writing. In 2008, he and friend Lindy Bumgarner started The Podium Foundation, with Robbins as the fledgling organization's first chair and Bumgarner as executive director, a role she filled until 2019 when she joined the marketing team of the Richmond area YMCA. Podium is a grassroots non-profit organization that provides youth in the Greater Richmond Metropolitan Area with the skills to become confident and capable readers, writers, and communicators. Podium holds weekly after-school, in-school, and summer programs and publishes both a quarterly zine and annual journal composed of students’ work.

In 2015, Robbins, with assistance from the Virginia War Memorial, founded "The Mighty Pen Project," a university-style writing class offered at no cost to veterans to encourage and teach them to share their stories. Two years after founding The Mighty Pen, the Virginia War Memorial approached Robbins about making the MPP a full-time program of the state-run War Memorial. Today, the Mighty Pen Project is one of the Virginia War Memorial's most prized programs, with Robbins doing the teaching. In recent years, Podium students have had opinion pieces published in the Richmond Times-Dispatch, online journals, and other school publications. The organization gives thousands of inner-city students the opportunity to experience the power of the written word and uncover their potential.

Again finding ways to spread the benefits of writing to deserving, underserved and traumatized communities, Robbins founded Frontline Writers https://www.frontlinewriters.org for first responders in the Richmond area, including fire, police, and emergency response personnel. Frontline Writers was designed similarly to the Mighty Pen, as a writing program to help capture and honor stories of service.

In addition to writing novels, Robbins is an avid sailor, sportsman, and musician.

When not traveling to research his novels, he lives in his hometown of Richmond, VA.

== Novels ==
Robbins' first book, Souls to Keep (pub. 1998 by HarperCollins), attracted little attention. His breakthrough came in 1999 with the publication of War of the Rats, a recounting of the Russian and German sniper duels over the city of Stalingrad. The novel became an international bestseller and made the New York Times "Also Selling" extended bestseller list.

Robbins followed War of the Rats with The End of War, another World War II-era tale of the approach of the Allied forces and the fall of Berlin, this time adding civilian perspectives to his narrative. His fourth novel, Scorched Earth, addressed contemporary racism in the American South. Robbins returned to World War II with Last Citadel, describing Cossack traditions and partisan warfare during the tank battle of Kursk in August 1943. Liberation Road deals with the experience of black and Jewish minorities in the U.S. Army during the war.

Branching from historical fiction into alternate history, The Assassin’s Gallery features the assassination of President Franklin D. Roosevelt. It is the first of Robbins’ novels to have a direct sequel: The Betrayal Game, in which an American teacher visiting Havana is embroiled in a conspiracy to assassinate Fidel Castro before the Bay of Pigs invasion.

Robbins' novel Broken Jewel was released in 2009 by Simon & Schuster. In this novel, Robbins explores the Pacific Theater and the atrocities committed upon the so-called “comfort women” enslaved by the Japanese military.

Beginning in 2012, Robbins next published a four-book series of novels about the US Air Force pararescue jumpers, called the "PJs." The series begins with an adventure tale of Somali pirates and international intrigue influenced by Mary Shelley, The Devil's Waters, was published in 2012 and reached #2 on Amazon's sales ranking. The sequel, The Empty Quarter, was published in 2014. The Devil's Horn is the third in the series. The PJ books conclude with The Low Bird, a novel based on the true-to-life rescue of an F-105 pilot downed in the Vietnam War.

In 2021, Robbins published another historical epic, Isaac's Beacon, set during the time between the end of WWII in 1945 and the creation of the state of Israel in 1948.

He is currently working on a novel about the Great Flood in the time of Noah.

== Bibliography ==
=== World War II novels ===
1. War of the Rats (Bantam, 2000), ISBN 055358135X
2. The End of War (Bantam, 2000), ISBN 0553581384
3. Last Citadel (Bantam, 2003), ISBN 0553583123
4. Liberation Road (Bantam, 2005), ISBN 0553801759
5. Broken Jewel (Simon & Schuster, 2009) ISBN 9781416590583

=== Alternate history ===
1. The Assassin’s Gallery (Bantam, 2006) ISBN 0553804413
2. The Betrayal Game (Bantam, 2008) ISBN 9780553804423

=== USAF Pararescue Thrillers ===
- The Devil's Waters (Thomas & Mercer, 2012), ISBN 1612186068
- The Empty Quarter (Thomas & Mercer, 2014), ISBN 1612186068
- The Devil's Horn (Thomas & Mercer, 2015), ISBN 1503945472
- The Low Bird (Thomas & Mercer, 2016), ISBN 1503940926

History of Israel

- Isaac's Beacon (Wicked Son, 2021) ISBN 978-1-64293-829-6

=== Other books ===
- Souls to Keep (HarperCollins, 1998), ISBN 0061013005
- Scorched Earth (Bantam, 2002), ISBN 0553801767
- The Finger: A Novel of Love & Amputation (Amazon, 2014)
