= Enemy at the Gates =

2001 film by Jean-Jacques Annaud

- Theatrical release poster
- Directed by: Jean-Jacques Annaud
- Written by: Jean-Jacques Annaud; Alain Godard
- Based on: Enemy at the Gates: The Battle for Stalingrad by William Craig
- Produced by: Jean-Jacques Annaud
- Starring: Joseph Fiennes; Jude Law; Rachel Weisz; Bob Hoskins; Ed Harris; Ron Perlman
- Cinematography: Robert Fraisse
- Edited by: Noëlle Boisson; Humphrey Dixon
- Music by: James Horner
- Production companies: Mandalay Pictures; Repérage Films
- Distributed by: Paramount Pictures (Note: Distribution rights for Enemy at the Gates were split among multiple companies internationally. Paramount Pictures handled distribution in North America and selected international territories, while Pathé Distribution handled the United Kingdom, Ireland and France, Constantin Film handled Germany, and Summit Entertainment handled international distribution.)
- Release date: 16 March 2001
- Running time: 131 minutes
- Countries: United States; United Kingdom; France; Germany; Ireland
- Languages: English; German; Russian
- Budget: $68 million
- Box office: $97 million

Enemy at the Gates (Stalingrad in France and L'Ennemi aux portes in Canada) is a 2001 war film directed, co-written, and produced by Jean-Jacques Annaud, based on William Craig's 1973 nonfiction book Enemy at the Gates: The Battle for Stalingrad, which describes the events surrounding the Battle of Stalingrad in the winter of 1942–1943. The screenplay was written by Annaud and Alain Godard. The film's main character is a fictionalized version of Vasily Zaitsev, a sniper and Hero of the Soviet Union during World War II. It depicts a snipers' duel between Zaitsev and a Wehrmacht sniper school director, Major Erwin König.

The cast includes Jude Law, Joseph Fiennes, Rachel Weisz, Bob Hoskins, Ed Harris, Ron Perlman, Eva Mattes, Gabriel Marshall Thomson, and Matthias Habich.

== Plot ==
Vassili Zaitsev, a replacement soldier of the Red Army, arrives east of the River Volga during the Battle of Stalingrad in 1942. After a dangerous trip across the river into the city, he is forced to join a human wave attack carrying only rifle cartridges. He takes cover during the chaotic battle with Commissar Danilov. With one rifle, Vassili kills five German soldiers before they escape.

Communist commisar Nikita Khrushchev asks his subordinates how to improve morale. Danilov recommends inspiring hope rather than punishing in fear and suggests that they revive the army newspaper and publishes heroic tales of Vassili's exploits. Vassili is transferred to the sniper division and becomes friends with Danilov. Both also become romantically interested in Tania Chernova, a private in the local militia. In fear for her safety, Danilov has her transferred to an intelligence unit, ostensibly to make use of her German skills in translating radio intercepts.

With Soviet snipers taking an increasing toll on the Germans, Major Erwin König is deployed to kill Vassili and crush Soviet morale. When the Red Army command learns of König's mission after he wipes out Vassili's sniper unit, they dispatch König's former student Koulikov to help Vassili kill him. König, however, outmaneuvers Koulikov and kills him, shaking Vassili's spirits. Danilov finds a boy, Sacha Filipov, who volunteers to act as a double agent by passing König false information about Vassili's whereabouts in exchange for food. Vassili sets a trap for König and manages to wound him with the help of Tania. During a second attempt, Vassili falls asleep, and his sniper log is stolen by a looting German soldier. The German command takes the log as evidence of Vassili's death and plans to send König home, but König does not believe that Vassili is dead.

General Friedrich Paulus confiscates König's dog tags to prevent Soviet propaganda from profiting if König is killed and identified. In turn, König gives the general a War Merit Cross that was posthumously awarded to his son, a lieutenant in the 116th Infantry Division who was killed in the early days of the battle. König tells Sacha where he will be next after deducing that the boy is responsible for his being wounded. Tania and Vassili have meanwhile fallen in love. That night, Tania secretly goes to the Soviet barracks and makes love with Vassili. The jealous Danilov disparages Vassili in a letter to his superiors.

König spots Tania and Vassili waiting for him at his next ambush spot, confirming his suspicions about Sacha. He then kills the boy and hangs his body to bait Vassili. Vassili vows to kill König and asks Tania and Danilov to evacuate Sacha's mother. Tania is wounded by shrapnel en route to the boats. Thinking she is dead, Danilov regrets his jealousy of Vassili and even his ardor for communist ideals begins to falter. Finding Vassili waiting to ambush König, Danilov removes his helmet and exposes himself to provoke König into shooting him and revealing his own position. Thinking that he has killed Vassili, König goes to inspect the body only to find himself in Vassili's rifle sights. Accepting his fate and removing his cap, König grimly turns to look Vassili in the face before being shot in the head.

Two months later, after Stalingrad has been liberated and German forces have surrendered, Vassili finds Tania alive and recovering in a field hospital.

== Cast ==
- Jude Law as Vassili
- Joseph Fiennes as Danilov
- Rachel Weisz as Tania
- Bob Hoskins as Khrushchev
- Ed Harris as Major König
- Ron Perlman as Koulikov
- Eva Mattes as Mother Filipov
- Gabriel Marshall-Thomson as Sacha
- Matthias Habich as General Paulus
- Andrej Kaminsky as Officer
- Robert Stadlober as Spotter
- Tom Wlaschiha as Soldier

== Production ==
The filming of Enemy at the Gates took place in Germany. The crossing of the Volga River was shot on the Altdöberner See, a man-made lake near the village of Pritzen, in the south of Brandenburg. A derelict factory in the village of Rüdersdorf was used to recreate the ruins of Stalingrad's tractor factory. The massive outdoor set of Stalingrad's Red Square was built at Krampnitz, near Potsdam. It was a former Wehrmacht riding school that had served as a Soviet barracks during the Cold War. Set construction began in October 1999 and took almost five months to complete. The scene at the end with the waving coats is a reference to the works of Sergio Leone.

== Soundtrack ==
The soundtrack to Enemy at the Gates was composed and conducted by James Horner and released on 31 March 2001.

No.	Title	Length
1.	"The River Crossing to Stalingrad"	15:13
2.	"The Hunter Becomes the Hunted"	5:53
3.	"Vassili's Fame Spreads"	3:40
4.	"Koulikov"	5:13
5.	"The Dream"	2:35
6.	"Bitter News"	2:38
7.	"The Tractor Factory"	6:43
8.	"A Sniper's War"	3:25
9.	"Sacha's Risk"	5:37
10.	"Betrayal"	11:28
11.	"Danilov's Confession"	7:13
12.	"Tania (End Credits)"	6:53
Total length:		76:31

== Reception ==
On Rotten Tomatoes, the film has a 53% approval rating from 139 critics. The website's consensus says: "Atmospheric and thrilling, Enemy at the Gates gets the look and feel of war right. However, the love story seems out of place." Metacritic, which assigns a normalized rating, calculated an average score of 53 out of 100, based on 33 reviews. Audiences polled by CinemaScore gave the film an average grade of "B" on an A+ to F scale.

Military historian David R. Stone praised the cast and stated that the film was "a good thing for the study of the Eastern Front during World War II", but criticized its historical inaccuracies and presentation, concluding: "To end on a brighter note, Enemy at the Gates has at the very least boosted the number of my students who drop by the office to ask questions about Stalingrad. I only wish it had done a better job of giving them good answers." For the Society for Military History, historian Roger Reese wrote: "As a work of fictionalized history this movie serves a useful purpose beyond entertainment, that of bringing to the attention of movie-goers in the West the sacrifices Soviet soldiers made in defending their country and defeating Hitler and giving a face to those legions still largely anonymous to us."

Roger Ebert of the Chicago Sun-Times gave the film three stars out of four and wrote that it "is about two men placed in a situation where they have to try to use their intelligence and skills to kill each other. When Annaud focuses on that, the movie works with rare concentration. The additional plot stuff and the romance are kind of a shame." New York's Peter Ranier was less kind, declaring: "It's as if an obsessed film nut had decided to collect every bad war-film convention on one computer and program it to spit out a script." Peter Travers of Rolling Stone admitted the film had faults but said that "any flaws in execution pale against those moments when the film brings history to vital life."

The film received unenthusiastic reviews in Russia, but was successful at the box office in Moscow and Saint Petersburg. Some Red Army Stalingrad veterans were so offended by inaccuracies in the film and the portrayal of the Red Army that on 7 May 2001, shortly after the film premiered in Russia, they expressed their displeasure in the State Duma, demanding a ban of the film. Their request was not granted. The film was also poorly received in Germany. Critics stated that it simplified history and glorified war. At the Berlinale film festival, it was booed. Annaud stated afterward that he would not present another film at Berlinale, calling it a "slaughterhouse" and said that his film received a much better reception elsewhere.

== Historical accuracy ==
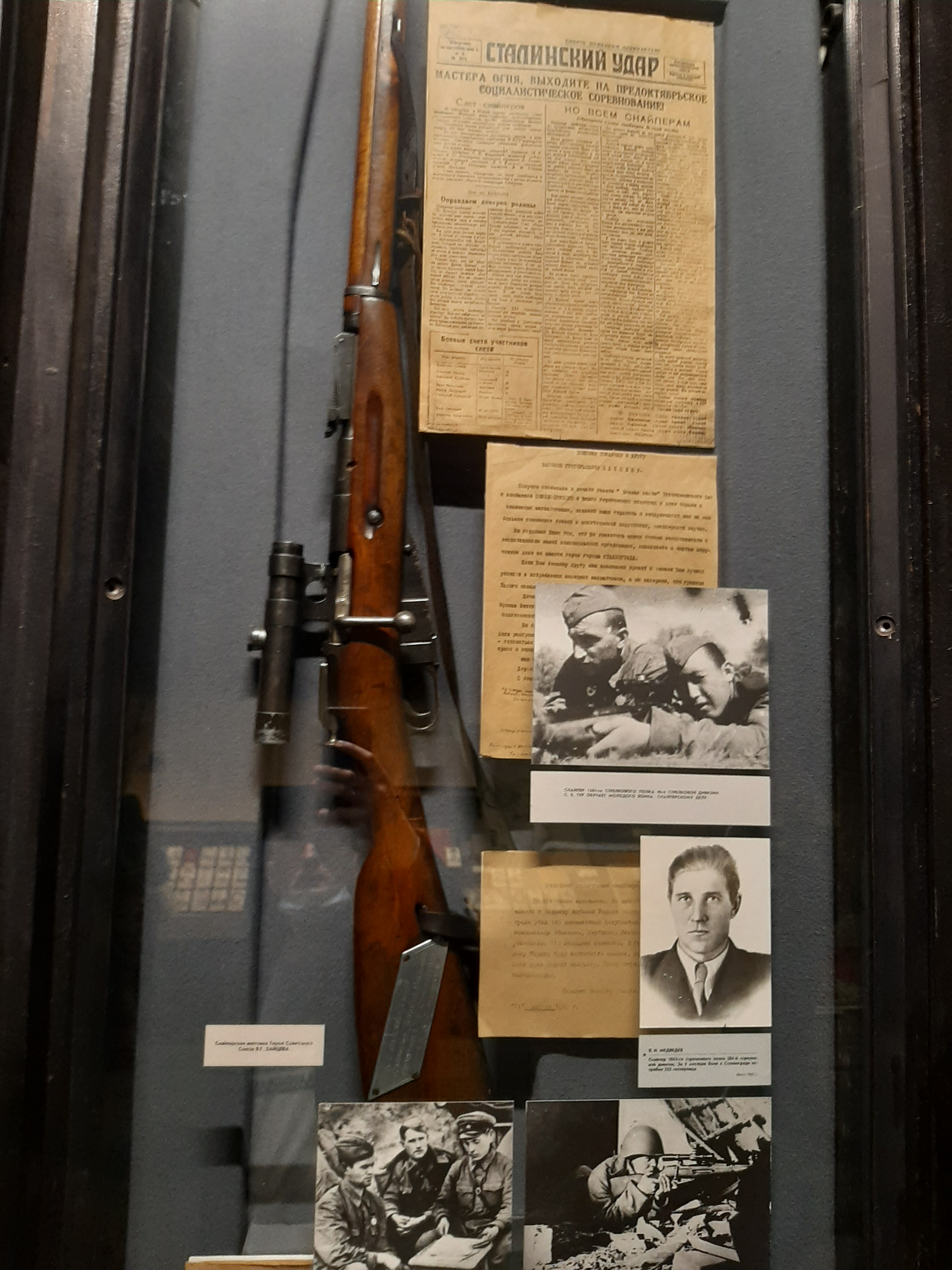
Zaitsev's sniper rifle on display at the Volgograd's Stalingrad Panorama Museum. Actor Jude Law (who portrays Zaitsev) uses an accurate version of the weapon in the film: a 7.62×54mmR Mosin Model 1891/30 sniper rifle with a PU 3.5× sniper scope.

While the film was inspired by real events, it was dramatized and its plot was fictionalized in several ways. It contained several inaccuracies, including about Vasily Zaitsev, developments of the war, graphic details, and maps depicting a modern map of Russia, Ukraine, and the Baltic states as independent countries, as well as Switzerland and Turkey being invaded by Nazi Germany. Zaitsev was a senior sergeant (Russian: ста́рший сержа́нт) in the 2nd Battalion, 1047th Rifle Regiment, 284th Tomsk Rifle Division, during the Battle of Stalingrad. The film uses events from William Craig's 1973 nonfiction book Enemy at the Gates: The Battle for Stalingrad, but is not a direct adaptation. The book by Zaitsev himself, There was no land for us beyond the Volga. Sniper's Notes (Russian: «За Волгой земли для нас не было. Записки снайпера»), which completely contradicts the point of view presented in Craig's book and the film on the events that took place, is not taken into account. Historian Antony Beevor said he believed Zaitsev's story to be fictional. There is no documentation about the duel between Zaytsev and Major Erwin König.

The film misrepresents the role of blocking detachments in the Red Army. Although there was Order No. 227 (Russian: Директива Ставки ВГК №227) that became the rallying cry of "Not a step back!" (Russian: Ни шагу назад!, romanized: Ni shagu nazad!), machine gunners were not placed behind regular troops with orders to kill anyone who retreated, and they were used only for penal troops. As per Order No. 227, each detachment would have between three and five barrier squads per 200 personnel. At the same time, the film has been accused of understating the role of women. In the film, two women snipers appear but never shoot at anyone; in fact, Soviet women snipers have been credited with killing over 10,000 enemies in combat. One of the depicted soldiers is Lyudmila Pavlichenko, gaining her famous facial scar in front of Zaitsev, although she has not been recorded teaming with him in combat.

The film's first scene shows new Soviet troops, including Zaitsev, arriving at the Stalingrad front, being screamed at, threatened, and in general humiliated by their commanders. They are then transported and locked in crowded boxcars to stop them from deserting. According to military historian Boris Yulin, that was forbidden and is unrealistic, as the soldiers would have then been killed in case of a German air raid or shelling. According to historian Alexey Isaev, who has written several books about the Battle of Stalingrad, blocking detachments were mostly used in Stalingrad as "usual combat regiments" although the film emphasizes the message that "most Soviet soldiers needed a literal gun in the back in order to go into battle". As there were many cases of heroism, it is argued it was unlikely that Soviet soldiers were motivated only by fear. In regard to the lack of weapons, which happened early in the war and changed by 1942, Isaev said: "There were no unarmed soldiers sent to the attack.... What is shown in Enemy at the Gates is pure nonsense."

== See also ==
- Battle of Stalingrad in popular culture
- American Sniper
