= Enemy at the Gates: The Battle for Stalingrad =

1973 history book by William Craig

- First edition
- Subject: Battle of Stalingrad during World War II
- Genre: History
- Pages: xvii, 457 pages
- ISBN: 0141390174
- OCLC: 613817

Enemy at the Gates: The Battle for Stalingrad is a book written by William Craig and published in 1973 by Reader's Digest Press and in 1974 by Penguin Publishing. The 2001 film Enemy at the Gates utilized the book's title and used it as one of its sources, but was not a direct adaptation of the work.

== Reception ==
The Slavic Review panned Enemy at the Gates, calling it "rambling and exaggerated" and negatively comparing Craig to former Nazi propagandist and author Paul Carell. In contrast, The Washington Post was more favorable and drew favorable comparisons to Cornelius Ryan.
