= William Craig (author) =

American author (1929–1997)

- Born: 1929
- Died: September 22, 1997 (aged 67–68)
- Occupation: Author
- Notable work: The Fall of Japan (1968); The Tashkent Crisis (1971); Enemy at the Gates: The Battle for Stalingrad (1973); The Strasbourg Legacy (1975)
- Spouse: Eleanor Russell (m. ?–1997; his death)
- Children: Four children, including William Craig

William Craig (1929 – September 22, 1997) was an American historian and author of fiction and non-fiction.

== Writing career ==
His first book, The Fall of Japan (1968), is a non-fiction account of the last weeks of the Second World War in the Pacific.

Craig's first novel, The Tashkent Crisis (1971), is a Cold War Era thriller about espionage and international politics. His second book on the Second World War, Enemy at the Gates: The Battle for Stalingrad, was published in 1973. Incidents from history were used to structure the movie Enemy at the Gates (2001). Craig's final book was a spy thriller, The Strasbourg Legacy (1975).

== Personal life ==
He married Eleanor Russell, who — as Eleanor Craig — was the bestselling author of four books, including P.S. You're Not Listening (1972). They had four children.

Their second son, William Craig, is the author of Yankee Come Home: On the Road from San Juan Hill to Guantanamo (2012).

== Bibliography ==
- The Fall of Japan (1968)
- The Tashkent Crisis (1971)
- Enemy at the Gates: The Battle for Stalingrad. Penguin Books. 1973. ISBN 0-14-139017-4.
- The Strasbourg Legacy. Berkley Medallion Books. 1975.
