= Shimon Markish =

Azerbaijani historian (1931–2003)

- Born: Simon Markish; March 6, 1931; Baku, Azerbaijan SSR, Soviet Union
- Died: December 5, 2003 (aged 72); Geneva, Switzerland
- Occupations: classical scholar; literary and cultural historian; translator; professor
- Spouse: 4
- Children: 2
- Writing career
- Period: 1954–2003
- Genres: history, literature, translation, classic studies
- Notable works: Erasmus and the Jews; (1986)

Shimon Markish (Russian: Симон/Шимон Перецович Маркиш, Hungarian: Markis Simon; March 6, 1931, in Baku – December 5, 2003, in Geneva) was a classical scholar, literary and cultural historian, translator.

== Family ==
His father Peretz Markish (1895–1952), the Yiddish poet was executed in the last Stalinist show-trial. He was executed as one of the thirteen Soviet Jews on the Night of the Murdered Poets which marked the end of the "anti-cosmopolitan" campaign aiming to destroy Jewish cultural figures, leading personalities of the Jewish cultural life and former members of the Jewish Antifascist Committee.

His mother was Esther Lazebnikova, a translator and publicist (1912–2010) and his brother is David Markish, a writer and poet. His uncle was journalist Alexander Lazebnikov (1907–1985).

== Life ==
=== In the USSR ===
The Markish family spent the war in evacuation, in Chistopol and then in Tashkent.

Markish enrolled in the English department at Moscow State University, but in 1949, after his father's arrest, he decided to change to the small and "hidden" field of classical philology.

His studies were interrupted by exile before his diploma: the family was arrested in January 1953 without having any news of the father. The family was sent to Central Asia, to Kazakhstan on February 1, 1953. The journey, which lasted two weeks, in prison train cars. In exile, Markish worked as a storekeeper, then (after Stalin's death) taught at school a variety of subjects.

He returned to Moscow in the summer of 1954, married the translator Inna Bernstein, and they had a son, Mark.

After receiving his diploma, Markish began working as a translator at the State Publishing House of Fiction (Gosudarstvennoie Izdatelstvo Khudozhestvennoi Literatury, 1956–1962). He translated primarily from ancient Greek and Latin, but also from English, German, sometimes under an assumed name, sometimes in collaboration with colleagues who found it difficult to work. In 1962 he was admitted to the Union of Soviet Writers (with the recommendation of Anna Akhmatova), and became a freelance translator. Between 1958 and 1970, he was the editor of several publications, including the series on the theory of literary translation. In addition to translating Apuleius, Plutarch, Plato, Lucian, Thomas Mann, Conan Doyle, Edgar Allan Poe, Mark Twain, William Faulkner, and Feuchtwanger, Markish wrote about ancient Greece, publishing Gomer i ego poemy (Homer and His Poems; 1962), Slava daliokikh vekov (Glorious faraway centuries, 1964), Mif o Prometee (The Myth of Prometheus, 1967) and Sumerki v polden’: Ocherk grecheskoi kul’tury v epokhu peloponnesskoi voiny (Dusk at Noon: A Study of Greek Culture at the Time of the Peloponnesian War; 1988). From the late 1960s his second field of research was Erasmus of Rotterdam whom he translated extensively and wrote two monographs on his life and works: Nikomu ne ustupliu (I will not cede to anyone, 1966) and Znakomstvo s Erazmom iz Rotterdama (Meet Erasmus of Rotterdam, 1971, also in Hungarian: Rotterdami Erasmus, 1976).

=== In Hungary ===
In 1970 he emigrated to Hungary by marriage, and had a second son, Pal. He worked on the theme "Erasmus and Jewry" but his next book on this topic was published only later, in 1979, in French (Erasme et les juifs, 1979), and in English (Erasmus and the Jews, 1986). In Hungary, he also translated a volume of Hungarian folk tales and joined the Hungarian branch of the Pen Club. Markish did not find a job, so he could not acquire a passport and could not leave the country to see his mother, who, in the meantime, had left the Soviet Union for Israel.

In 1973 he visited Moscow for the last time and he has never returned to the Soviet Union after that. Finally, with the help of the Hungarian Academy of Sciences, having got a job "without salary", he could obtain a passport and travel to see his mother in Paris. There the main goal was to organize his moving to the West, out of Hungary.

He was invited to join the new Russian department of the University of Geneva. With difficulty and a whole semester late, having received permission to leave only for half a year, he arrived in Geneva in February 1974. After the expiration of his passport, he did not return to Hungary and stayed abroad illegally. His wife and son did not follow him, she divorced in his absentia.

=== In emigration ===
Markish worked at the Department of Russian in Geneva for 22 years, until his retirement in 1996. He dedicated the greater part of his life to the research on Russian-Jewish literature, a subject that he established, promoted, and enriched as a field of research. He wrote essays and books on major Russian-Jewish writers, notably Vassily Grossman (Le cas Grossman [The Grossman Case]; 1986), whose novel Life and Fate (Zhizn’ i sud’ba) was smuggled to the West on microfilm of bad quality and read with difficulties by Markish and Efim Etkind for the publication (Lausanne, 1980). His afterword to the Jerusalem collection of Isaac Babel’s stories was the first to analyze Babel’s double Jewish identity (Russko-evreiskaia literatura i Isaak Babel in Detstvo i drugie rasskazy [Childhood and Other Stories, 1979]).

Markish also compiled several anthologies of works by Russian-Jewish writers (on Ossip Rabinovich, Lev Levanda, Grigory Bogrov, Vassily Grossman, Ilya Ehrenburg, and Isaac Babel, as well as the book Rodnoi golos [Native Voice: Pages from Russian Jewish Literature; 2001]).

He obtained an Israeli passport in 1975. In 1982 he married for the third time.

In 1983 he defended his doctoral dissertation on "Russian-Jewish literature" at the Sorbonne University of Nanterre, Paris X. In 1983 he taught one semester at Colgate University in Hamilton, New York.

In 1987 he was invited as a senior researcher to the Research Institute and the Jabotinsky Institute of the Hebrew University of Jerusalem.

Between 1991 and 1993 he was co-editor of the Evreiskii Zhurnal with Eitan Finkelshtein (Jewish Journal, Munich).

Since 1991 he lived with Zsuzsa Hetényi who became his fourth wife. She became the copyright heir after Markish's death.

In 1995, Markish was returned to Hungarian citizenship after being deprived of it in 1987, and in 1997 he became a Swiss citizen. He was Professor of Humanities at the Department of English Studies at Florida International University in 1996–1997.

In 1998, he delivered the opening lecture at the plenary session at the Nobel Symposium on Literary Translation in Stockholm. In the 1999–2000 academic year he was a senior researcher at the Collegium Budapest for Advanced Studies in Budapest.

In 2002 he was invited to the jubilee meeting for an opening lecture by the International Erasmus Society of Rotterdam in Holland.

A translator from six languages, Markish completed his last work in October 2003, a joint translation with Zsuzsa Hetényi of Imre Kertész's Nobel prize-winning 1975 novel Fatelessness (Sorstalanság) into Russian. For their translation, they were awarded the Füst Milán Fellowship for Literary Translation by the Hungarian Academy of Sciences.

He died suddenly in December 2003 in Geneva.

== Main works ==
=== Collected works ===
- Непрошедшее прошлое. Cобрание сочинений Шимона Маркиша, 1-5.; edited by Zsuzsa Hetényi; ELTE–MűMű, Budapest
  - Том 1. Античность; 2020
  - Том 2. Эразм и его время; 2021
  - Том 3. Русско-еврейская литература. Часть 1. Три отца-основателя; 2021
  - Том 4. Русско-еврейская литература. Часть 2. Читая «Восход»; 2021
  - Том 5. Русско-еврейская литература. Часть 3. Примеры и выборы. ХХ век; 2021

=== Books, monographs ===
- Гомер и его поэмы; Москва, «ГИХЛ» (1962); «Художественная литература» (1971)
- Слава далеких веков. Из Плутарха. Пересказ с древнегреческого; Москва, «Детская литература» (1964)
- Никому не уступлю; Москва, «Детская литература» (1966); in Lithuanian: Niekam Nenusileisiu; Vilnius, «Vaizdo» (1969)
- Знакомство с Эразмом из Роттердама; Москва, «Художественная литература» (1971); in Hungarian: Rotterdami Erasmus. Budapest, «Gondolat» (1976); in French: Erasme et les Juifs; traduit du russe par Mary Fretz; Paris, «L’Age D’Homme» (1979)
- Le cas Grossman; Paris, «Julliard» / «L’age d’Homme» (1983)
- Василий Семёнович Гроссман: На еврейские темы. Том 2. / Шимон Маркиш: Пример Василия Гроссмана; Библиотека-Алия, Иерусалим, 1985
- Erasmus and the Jews; transl. by A. Olcott, afterword by A. A. Cohen; The University of Chicago Press (1986)
- Сумерки в полдень; Тель-Авив, «Лим» (1988); С.-Петербург, «Университетская книга» (1999)
- Три примера (Бабель, Эренбург, Гроссман) [in Hebrew]; Тель-Авив, «Hakibbutz Hameuchad» (1994)
- Бабель и другие. «Персональная творческая мастерская, Михаил Щиголь»; Киев (1996); Иерусалим, «Гешарим» (1997)
- Родной голос. Страницы русско-еврейской литературы конца ХIХ – начала ХХ в. Книга для чтения; red. Шимон Маркиш; Киев, «Дух и Литера» (2001)

== Awards ==
- Füst Milán Fellowship for Literary Translation – Hungarian Academy of Sciences (with Zsuzsa Hetényi), 2002

== Sources ==
- Поверх барьеров с Иваном Толстым. Памяти филолога Шимона Маркиша (2021)
- Shimon Markish in the YIVO Encyclopedia of Jews in Eastern Europe (by Zsuzsa Hetényi, Alice Nakhimovsky)
