= Polyushko Pole (disambiguation) =

Polyushko Pole is a Soviet Russian-language song.

Polyushko Pole may also refer to:

- David Markish has a novel Polyushko-Polye about Nestor Makhno
- Boris Mozhayev, a Soviet writer of "rustic style" wrote his Polyushko-Polye novel about kolkhoz life.
- Polyushko Pole: Le Vent Vert ~ Le Temps Bleu, a 1998 single by Origa

Films

- A 1956 Soviet film directed by Vera Stroyeva
