= Tirade of the nose =

Monologue in Rostand's play "Cyrano de Bergerac"

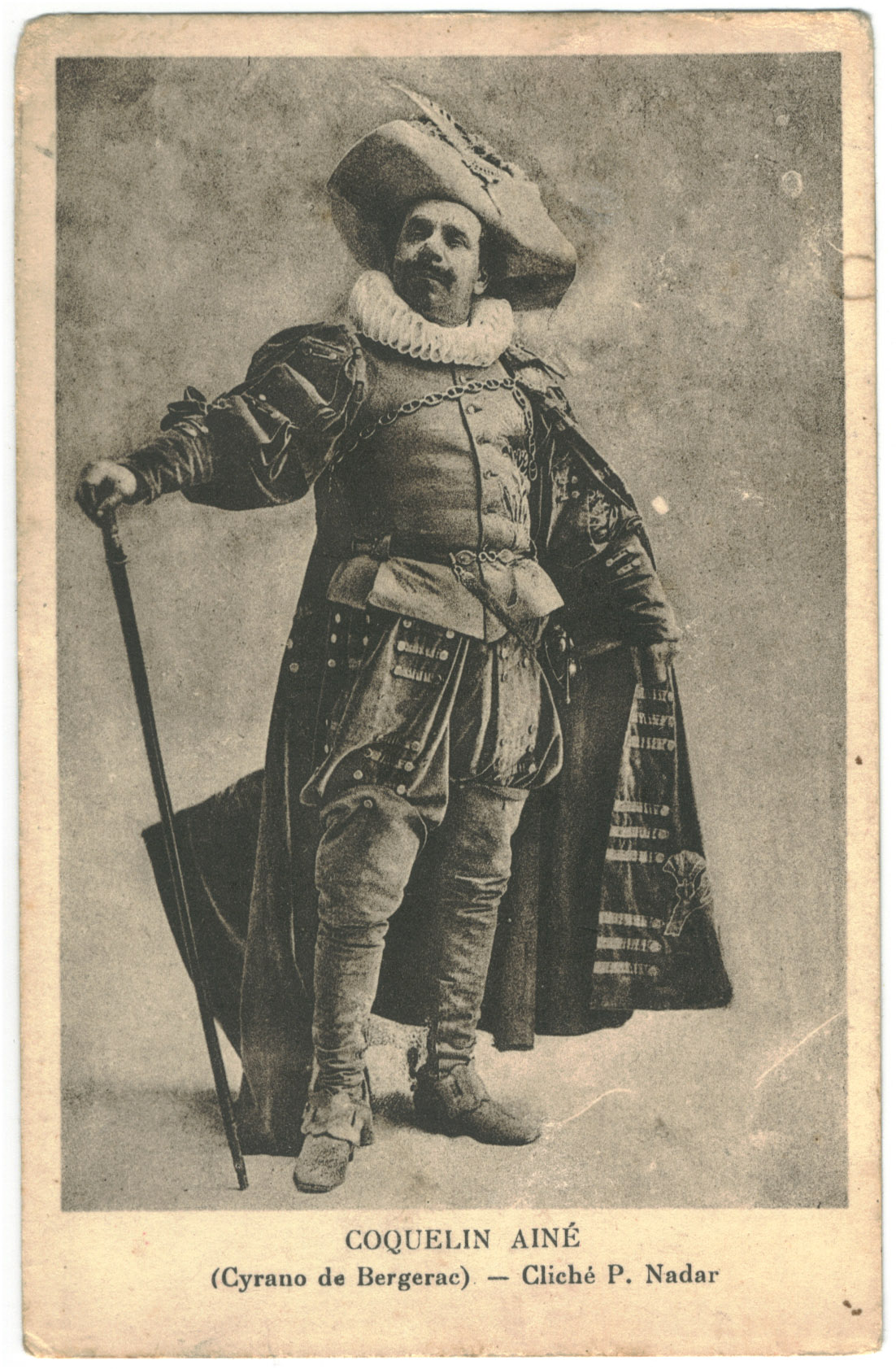
Benoît-Constant Coquelin in the role of Cyrano de Bergerac

The nose tirade (French: tirade du nez), also known as the tirade of the noses (French: tirade des nez), (Note: Bergerac's tirade is also known as the monologue about the nose, or noses.) is a celebrated monologue from the five-act heroic comedy in verse Cyrano de Bergerac by the French neo-romantic playwright Edmond Rostand. The play tells of the love and fate of the poet, philosopher and duellist Cyrano de Bergerac for his cousin Roxane, who fails to appreciate in time his brave and noble character and his literary gift. The freedom-loving poet dies defying Death, having first confessed his feelings to his beloved. The drama is set during the so-called Grand Siècle of French history and literature, is rich in local colour, and features characters whose images go back to real people.

Cyrano, who has a disproportionately large nose, delivers the monologue in the first act in response to a sneer at this physical defect from the arrogant Viscount de Valvert. Answering a trite reproach about the size of his nose, Cyrano offers, in a lengthy tirade, twenty witty remarks about his own flaw. He then challenges the viscount to a duel, composing a mocking ballade as he fights, and wounds him.

For a long time the real Bergerac was little known to the general public, and the revival of interest in him is linked to essays by the romantic poets Charles Nodier and Théophile Gautier. The latter wrote a lengthy passage about Bergerac's nose and the influence of this part of the face on his character. Rostand, who knew this essay, is thought to have used it as a starting point for his monologue. Other researchers have noted that a reflection close in form and content appears in a dialogue by Erasmus, which was probably reflected in the play.

== Synopsis ==
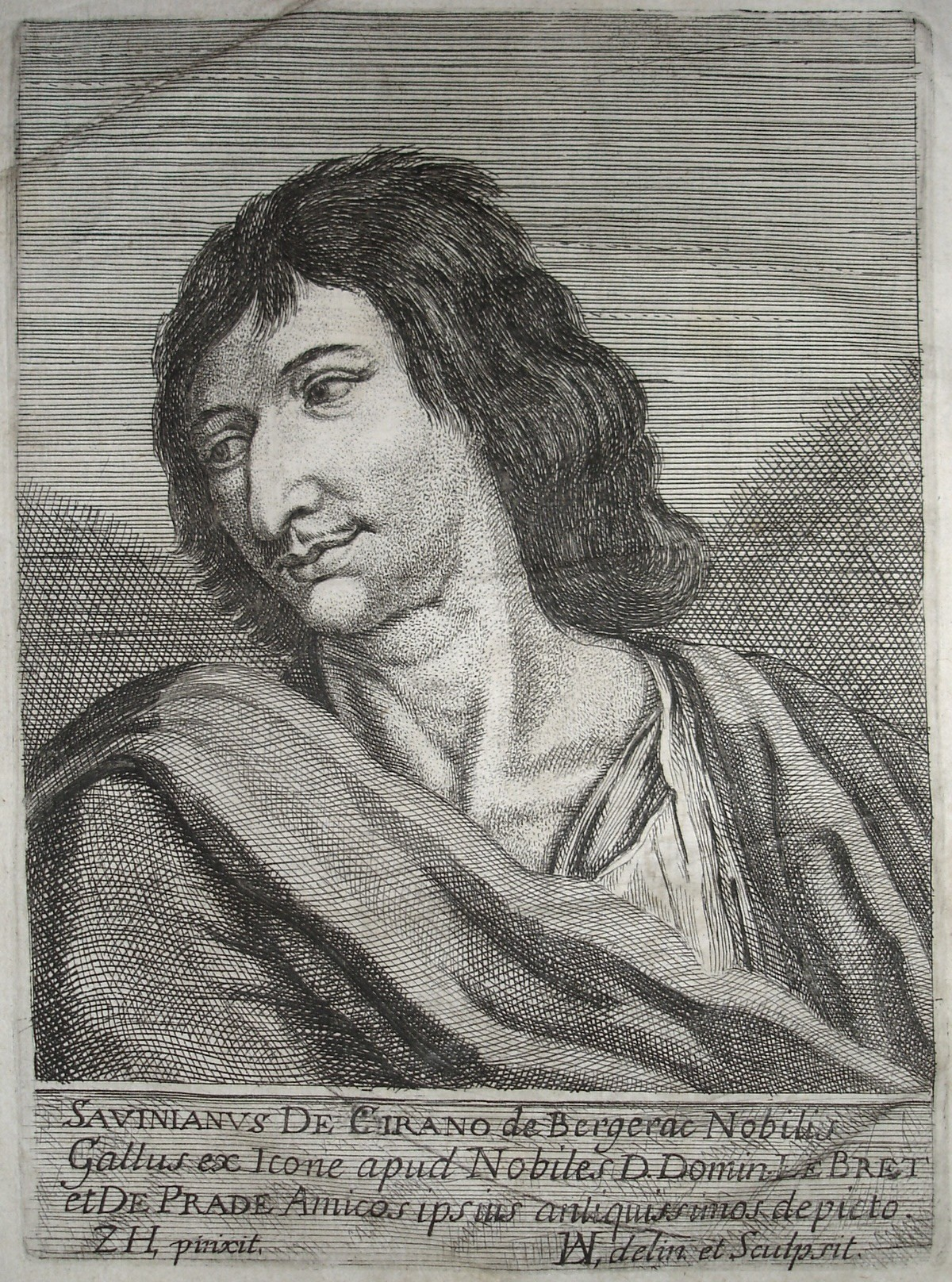
Engraving depicting Cyrano de Bergerac, included in the 1654 edition of his works

Edmond Rostand's heroic comedy opens in 1640 during a performance at the Parisian theatre the Hôtel de Bourgogne. It features a considerable number of historical figures, contemporaries of the real Cyrano de Bergerac, though their images, like that of the title character, were creatively reworked by the author. Over time the name of the freedom-loving poet and philosopher became a byword for a person with an enormous nose. At the start of the play Cyrano's friend, the pastry cook François Ragueneau (a real member of the bohème, died 1654), relates: "And what a nose! There is no other like it in the world! Seeing this nose sail by so majestically, anyone would exclaim: 'No, this is really too much! It must be false!' But here is the trouble: Monsieur de Cyrano has grown to it forever."

The poet himself declares that he will teach a lesson to anyone who mocks his nose, and that if the offender is a nobleman he will challenge him to a duel. The arrogant Viscount de Valvert, present at the performance, insults Cyrano and says that "Your nose… yes, yes… your nose… is very large." Such a brief and trite insult provokes Cyrano's derision, and in reply he begins to offer far wittier remarks about his nose. The tirade opens:

Ah ! non ! c'est un peu court, jeune homme !
On pouvait dire… Oh ! Dieu !… bien des choses en somme…
En variant le ton…

— Cyrano, act I, scene IV

In sum, Cyrano protests, the affront was far too short, and a great many things might have been said by varying the tone. Each of the twenty quips that follow opens with an explanatory characterizing word: (Note: The list below follows the Russian translation used as the basis for this section. In Rostand's original French the tones are labelled, in order, agressif, amical, descriptif, curieux, gracieux, truculent, prévenant, tendre, pédant, cavalier, emphatique, dramatique, admiratif, lyrique, naïf, respectueux, campagnard, militaire and pratique (aggressive, friendly, descriptive, inquisitive, gracious, truculent, considerate, tender, pedantic, offhand, emphatic, dramatic, admiring, lyric, naive, respectful, rustic, military, practical), closing with a parody of Pyramus.) In the pedantic variation, for instance, Cyrano invents a fantastical beast that he claims Aristophanes called the Hippocampelephantocamelos. The monologue ends with Cyrano's thrust at his offender, who, in his words, possesses neither wit nor intelligence: "But if you, Viscount, rising in mind, were by some miracle to acquire a talent for barbed jokes after the fashion of mine, believe me, in that very instant I would make you hold your tongue. I am ready to laugh at myself to my heart's content, but I will not allow you, sir, to help me in it."

The enraged viscount exclaims that Cyrano is a "petty nobleman" dressed like a servant, and hurls reproaches at him: "Dolt! Blockhead! Rascal! Dullard! Lout!". In response to the insults the poet challenges his offender to a duel, during which he composes and recites on the spot a mocking ballade about their fight, then wounds de Valvert, while the theatre audience applauds the freethinker's talent and courage.

== History ==
=== Reception ===
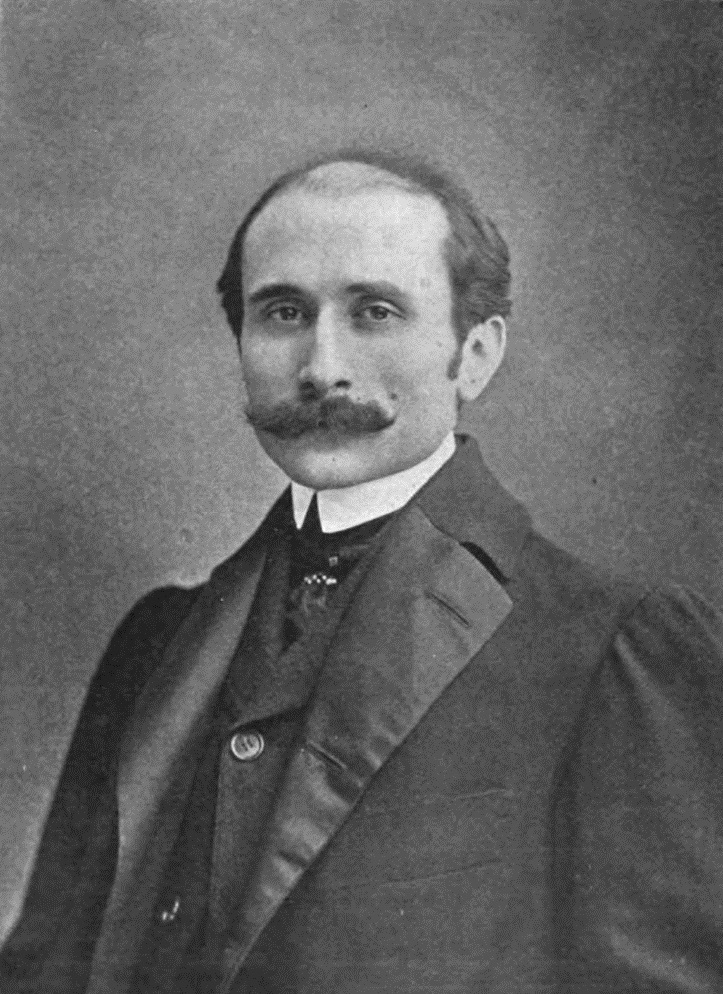
Edmond Rostand

Edmond Rostand's heroic comedy Cyrano de Bergerac, which became one of the most famous in the history of French neo-romanticism and theatre, was staged at the Parisian Porte-Saint-Martin on 28 December 1897. The role of Cyrano was played by the theatre's director and leading actor, Coquelin the Elder, to whom the play was dedicated. It was written in classical Alexandrine verse, both as a stylization and homage to the poetic tradition of the 17th century and as testimony to the author's romantic aspirations.

At its premiere the play met with unprecedented success, comparable only to the triumphant reception of Pierre Corneille's Le Cid and Victor Hugo's Hernani; yet nothing had foreshadowed it. At the dress rehearsal the author embraced Coquelin in tears and said: "Forgive me, my friend! Forgive me for dragging you into this hopeless affair!" Rostand was also disheartened by the attitude of one close friend, who urged the poet's wife, the poet Rosemonde Gérard, to cut from the production the monologue about the nose that later became famous, on the grounds that this long speech might supposedly make the drama "a general laughing stock!" A decade and a half later the author recalled that neither Coquelin nor the other performers expected a warm reception from the public, and that he himself was "terribly oppressed; the doubts and fears of others crushed me."

However, the fears of those involved in the production proved unfounded. Already after the fifth act the audience gave an ovation, chanting "Ed-mond Ros-tand!..". After the performance the tired but happy Coquelin, finding the author, told him: "For such a work it is a pleasure even to die." The play, which revived Hugo's romantic traditions, was enthusiastically received by theatregoers and critics alike. At the same time, among supporters of realist theatre (as shown, for example, by the diary entry of the director André Antoine, who did not fail to remark on Rostand's "miracle"), this late "flare-up" of romanticism aroused fears for the fate of the aesthetic dear to them. Indeed, right-wing critics used Rostand's success to attack social, realist drama. In 1913, a few years before the playwright's death, he attended the thousandth performance of his most celebrated work. Analysing the success of this drama ("one of the most performed plays of the French theatre"), Efim Etkind noted: "Rostand managed to combine in it the most diverse principles: the pathetic and the comic, the sentimental and the heroic, the sparklingly witty and the slow and pensive, the romantically decorative and the historically authentic."

=== The legend of Cyrano's nose ===
Thanks to the unprecedented success at the premiere and the play's subsequent popularity, the historical prototype, the soldier, satirist, poet, playwright and philosopher Hercule-Savinien Cyrano de Bergerac (1619–1655), gained additional fame, entering the ranks of the "popular heroes" of French culture. Several decades earlier, interest in the half-forgotten 17th-century freethinking poet had been revived by the romantic writers Charles Nodier (Revue de Paris; 1831) and Théophile Gautier (France littéraire; 1834). On the wave of this interest, a collected edition of Bergerac's works was published in 1858, and his personality began to attract the attention of researchers and readers. In 1876 the French writer and librettist Louis Gallet published the adventure novel Le Capitaine Satan ("Captain Satan"), in which Cyrano appears as a "magical helper" to the central characters. In this adventure-filled book Cyrano is endowed with "a huge, sharp nose almost covering the upper lip, a true heroic nose, as one of the poet's biographers called it."

Cyrano was best known for his "enormous" nose, but researchers doubt the historical accuracy of this. The spread of the legend (the "nosological mythology", in the words of the literary historian Vera Milchina about this physical defect was apparently aided by lines from Cyrano's own fantastical novel The Other World, or the States and Empires of the Moon (1662). They are spoken by an inhabitant of the Moon in a description of the customs that prevail there: "a large nose is a sign of wit, courtesy, affability, nobility and generosity, while a small nose testifies to the opposite traits. That is why the snub-nosed are made eunuchs, for the Republic prefers to have no children at all rather than children resembling eunuchs." The legend of the great poet's large nose was expressed most clearly in Théophile Gautier's essay "Cyrano de Bergerac", included in the collection Les Grotesques (1844), which Rostand had known since his schooldays. According to Vera Milchina, this work by Gautier, written under the influence of Nodier's essay, opens with a kind of "prose poem", running "over four pages about noses in general and Cyrano's gigantic nose in particular."

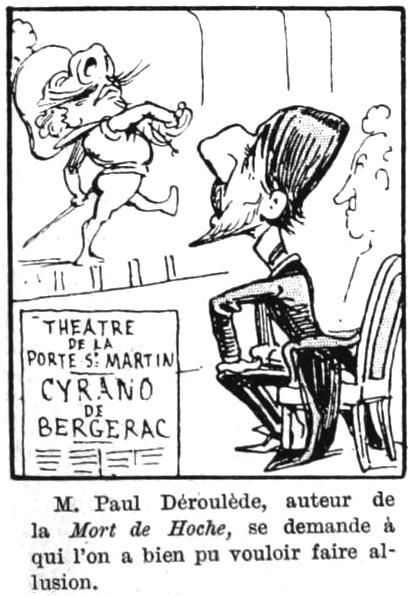
Hector Moloch. Caricature of the nationalist politician Paul Déroulède, whose parodic image was inspired by Bergerac's huge nose. 1898

It was Gautier who wrote about "nosology" and the role that the physical defect played in the fate of the Grand Siècle poet. He began with the reflection that, in the opinion of physiologists, "the length of the nose is a sure indicator of intelligence, valour and other virtues, and that a great man cannot have a small little nose." The writer gave a series of historical examples (Socrates, Julius Caesar, Napoleon Bonaparte, Corneille) intended to prove that the shape of the nose influences a person's merits and character. "Look at the portraits, at the medals: you will see that the more illustrious the hero, the longer (though by no means the wetter!) his nose." Gautier also noted that his impression of the gascon's remarkable facial feature was based on an engraving placed in the first volume of his works: "I was so struck by his gigantic and unusually shaped nose that I dwelt on this subject longer than it deserves…".

Describing Bergerac's portrait, Gautier dwelt on its memorable features, in particular drawing attention to the following:

This improbable nose sprawls freely over the face, depicted in three-quarter view, filling at least a quarter of it; in the middle it forms a mountain second in height only to the Himalayas, and then plunges downward, casting a broad shadow over the whole mouth… Were it not for the nose, what a handsome young man this would be! Yet this ill-starred organ became for Cyrano de Bergerac an occasion to display, day after day, his valour in endless duels. If anyone had the misfortune, on looking at this nose, not to hide his astonishment, a duel awaited the curious one at once.

Paul Lacroix, in his preface "A historical note on Cyrano de Bergerac" to the 1858 edition (2nd ed. 1875) of the poet's works, wrote: "He, as Charles Nodier put it, regarded excessive attention to the numerous scars covering his nose as an insult." Nodier may have come upon this fact in the Literary Anecdotes of the abbé Raynal, where it was mentioned that Cyrano stabbed about a dozen men for mocking his maimed nose. At the same time, Lacroix did not reflect the "nosological" reasoning from Gautier's essay. In the edition of Cyrano's works chronologically closest to the appearance of Rostand's play, which came out in 1886, the preface by Eugène Müller mentioned neither Nodier and Gautier nor the poet's large nose at all.

=== Classical and Renaissance antecedents ===
Gábor Petneházi, a classicist, traced the theme of the nose tirade back to ancient times and argued Rostand learned it from 16th-century writers. Petneházi relied on a 1941 essay by Otto Weinreich. The root of the nose tirade is apparently a two-line epigram attributed to the emperor Trajan in the Greek Anthology: a man with a large enough nose can tell the time like a sundial.

Thomas More translated the epigram into Latin in 1494 (known as In vehementer nasutum, "About a man with an extremely large nose"), and over the next two centuries it spread through various Latin and local translations. The real Cyrano de Bergerac used a modified version in his book The Other World, or the States and Empires of the Moon, where people on the Moon tell time using the shadows their noses cast on their teeth. The Greek original does not mention teeth, so it is likely that Cyrano read some later translation rather than the original. The nose theme was popular in French theater of the time: in 1610, the comic actor Bruscambille delivered a speech praising the nose at the Hôtel de Bourgogne (the same place where Rostand sets Cyrano's famous monologue). Petneházi agrees with Weinreich and suggests Rostand left out the sundial joke itself because mechanical clocks had made the concept outdated.

Petneházi points suggests work by Erasmus, a close friend of More, to be an inspiration for the structure of the tirade, with its rapid sequence of creative jokes. Following O.F. Long, he suggests a specific dialogue by Erasmus, De captandis sacerdotiis ("In pursuit of benefices"), as the direct link to Rostand's work. In this text, a character names many funny uses for a giant nose, from a lamp-snuffer and wall peg to a bellows, grappling iron, trumpet, spade, and anchor. This polymorphous nose resembles the Rostand's Cyrano describing his nose in twenty different tones. Petneházi points out that Laurence Sterne had already quoted the Erasmus dialogue directly in Tristram Shandy, naming both Bruscambille and Erasmus as experts on "noseology". Ultimately, invoking an adage from Erasmus's Adagia, he concludes that

Petneházi also states that the Erasmus' dialogue uses a Latin pun, with the words nasus and nasutus meaning both "nose" or "big-nosed" and "wit" or "witty." He suggests the two big-nosed characters in the text might be playful references by Erasmus and More to themselves: both men had large noses, enjoyed teasing (Erasmus even left self-portraits exaggerating his own nose), so Petneházi suggests that More and Erasmus together brought back the ancient nose jokes, starting the literary path that eventually reached Rostand.

=== Bergerac's writings ===
Sylvaine Guyot, a scholar studying the French literature, points to a well-known at its time (in 1654) "letter X" by Bergerac himself titled "Against a Fat Man" (French: Contre un gros homme), addressed to Zacharie Jacob (an actor with a stage name Montfleury, who was a rival of Bergerac). In the letter, Bergerac mercilessly attacks Montfleury's obesity. Of this real-life conflict. Rostand used only the Montfleury's name and his "hippopotamus-like bulk", describing a fight for the right to perform on stage. Cyrano-the-character successfully banishes the fat man in favor of a long-nosed one, with this nose remembered by posterity (just like Bergerac-the-writer promised to real-life Jacob that his girth will be immortalized through the letter X).

=== Analysis of the monologue ===
The heroic comedy Cyrano de Bergerac is a play about a poet, written by a great poet. Part of the play's exposition, the famous scene demonstrates Cyrano's bright literary talent, his great erudition, his sense of humour and his self-irony. As a poet the author achieves a polished mastery here. The comedy's verse is supple, expressive and light. Now it flows smoothly, now it rushes swiftly forward. The poet is equally successful with large philosophical or lyrical monologues and with dynamic dialogues, true verbal duels. Rostand's rhymes are, as a rule, fresh, unexpected and full of meaning; their organizing role is great.

— Andrei Mikhailov on the play's merits.

One of the most famous scenes of the drama is Cyrano's witty monologue (tirade) about his nose (act I, scene IV), which arose as a response to the unoriginal remark of the haughty but ungifted Viscount de Valvert, one of the entourage of Count Antoine de Guiche, Duke de Gramont (1604–1678). The famous scene demonstrates Cyrano's bright literary talent, his great erudition, his sense of humour and his self-irony. According to researchers, the title character accepts criticism, and even insult, only when it comes from himself or, perhaps, from someone he considers worthy. In the assessment of the literary scholar Mikhail Yasnov, the "image of the nose" for the legendary French freethinker most likely represents above all a symbol, a metaphor of freedom, an embodiment of "freedom of thought, of action, of imagination, of everything for which he lived and wrote."

The play made a great impression on Maxim Gorky, who attended a performance in Nizhny Novgorod in early 1900. The writer shared his thoughts with Anton Chekhov in a letter of 21–22 January of that year ("And have you seen 'Cyrano de Bergerac' on stage? I saw it recently and was delighted with the play…") and in the article "'Cyrano de Bergerac'. A heroic comedy by Edmond Rostand" (Nizhegorodsky Listok; 5 January 1900). This article copiously quotes the text of the play in the Russian translation by Tatiana Shchepkina-Kupernik. Gorky characterized the poet as a "bold gascon, whose tongue is sharp as a sword, and whose sword is straight and accurate as his tongue", and as a "madcap, a merry fellow who kills the vulgarity and stupidity embodied in the person of the marquis Valvert, kills it while gaily declaiming verse". This episode, in the Russian prose writer's opinion, is one of the best in Rostand's heroic comedy. Yet for all his merits, for all Cyrano's "spiritual beauty", his face is disfigured: "He loves and suffers, for it is no secret to him that he is ugly. On his bold face has grown a huge, absurd nose. De Bergerac knows that the woman he loves will not give him her heart." The Russian writer, with "pleasure", quotes almost in full Bergerac's variations on the nose, describing this scene as "a large one, woven entirely of witticisms and vividly portraying both the hero's character and the author's talent."

Efim Etkind gave as one of the main reasons for the play's longevity the fact that its central character vividly embodies the national spirit, the French (gascon) character of the hero: "The romantic principle in the play is obvious: the guardsmen and musketeers are akin to the heroes of Alexandre Dumas; Cyrano, a bretteur and duellist, is close to d'Artagnan, his exploits are legendary, his love monologues resemble the verses of Lamartine." The hero's popularity was also aided by the fact that several types and literary styles merged in his many-sided image (the real prototype; the man of letters striving to please his beloved, writing for her in the verbose précieux manner; and others). Regarding the monologue about the nose, Etkind noted its comedic dramatic tradition in the spirit of Molière.

Mikhail Yasnov drew attention to the fact that Gautier's thoughts about Cyrano's portrait apparently inspired Rostand's monologue about the nose. Other researchers (in particular, Boris Purishev) pointed out that the monologue goes back to the satirical anticlerical dialogue "In Pursuit of Benefices" by Erasmus, which opens his collection Colloquies (1518). In this little scene two friends meet, Pamphagus and Cocles, who have not seen each other for many years. Pamphagus manages to recognize his old friend by his large nose and lists how it might be used, including, for example: "You will be a herald, it will be a trumpet; a bugler, and it a horn; a digger, and it a spade; a reaper, and it a sickle; a sailor, and it an anchor. In the kitchen it will be a fork, and at the fishing a hook." The influence of this dialogue on the famous scene from Rostand's play was also pointed out by such a major specialist on Erasmus's works as Shimon Markish.

The semiotician and literary theorist Umberto Eco, in his article "My Lists", wrote that Cyrano's "famous" tirade about his own nose is based on the "evaluative enumeration of properties", a device widespread in various cultures (the "praise of Tyre" in chapter 27 of the Book of Ezekiel; the Song of Songs; the "hymn in honour of England" from the second act of William Shakespeare's historical chronicle Richard II). The difference is that in Rostand the matter concerns not beauty or the praise of something, but the description of "male ugliness". The literary scholar and semiotician Sergei Zenkin cited the monologue as an example of a "paradigmatic run-through of different styles in one and the same text and for expressing one and the same thematic invariant". In the tirade, on the basis of a perfectly simple phrase about a long nose, Cyrano begins to improvise, creating a whole series of inventive variants. The book Exercises in Style by Raymond Queneau, which consists of about a hundred variations based on the most banal of stories, is built on a similar device. "In both cases the reader or theatre spectator is graphically shown different ways of saying the same thing, and is invited to distinguish and recognize the connotations on which they are based", Zenkin remarked.

== Sources ==
- Brant, Sebastian (1971). Корабль дураков; Эразм Роттердамский. Похвала глупости. Навозник гонится за орлом. Разговоры запросто; Письма тёмных людей; Ульрих фон Гуттен. Диалоги [The Ship of Fools; Erasmus of Rotterdam. The Praise of Folly; The Dung Beetle Chases the Eagle; Colloquies; Letters of Obscure Men; Ulrich von Hutten. Dialogues]. Library of World Literature (in Russian). Trans. from German and Latin. Moscow: Khudozhestvennaya Literatura. p. 768.
- Buszewicz, Elwira (2020). ""Nos haec miramur". Curiositas w epigramatach Jana Kochanowskiego" ["Nos haec miramur": Curiositas in Jan Kochanowski's Epigrams] (PDF). Pamiętnik Literacki (in Polish). 111 (2): 101–108. doi:10.18318/pl.2020.2.7. ISSN 0031-0514.
- Cyrano de Bergerac, Savinien de (2002). Иной свет, или Государства и Империи Луны [The Other World, or the States and Empires of the Moon] (in Russian). Trans. from French, comp., pref. and comm. by M. Yasnov. Saint Petersburg: Ivan Limbakh Publishing. p. 248.
- Eco, Umberto (2013). "My Lists". Откровения молодого романиста [Confessions of a Young Novelist]. Umberto Eco. Collected Works (in Russian). Moscow: AST. pp. 181–299. ISBN 978-5-17-077819-5.
- Gallet, Louis (1992). Капитан Сатана [Captain Satan]. Library of Adventure and Fantasy (in Russian). Grodno: Stalker. p. 400. ISBN 5-8462-0011-7.
- Gorky, Maxim (1953). Полное собрание сочинений в 30 томах [Complete Works in 30 Volumes] (in Russian). Vol. 23. Articles (1895–1906). Moscow: State Publishing House for Literature. p. 402.
- Guyot, Sylvaine (2008). "Le nez de Cyrano". In Bargy, Hervé; Mothu, Alain (eds.). Cyrano de Bergerac, Cyrano de Sannois. Les Styles du savoir (in French). Turnhout: Brepols. pp. 275–288. doi:10.1484/M.STSA-EB.4.00019. ISBN 978-2-503-52384-2.
- Long, Omera Floyd (1913). "Rostand and Erasmus". Modern Language Notes. 28 (7): 226–227. doi:10.2307/2916451. JSTOR 2916451.
- Markish, Shimon (2021). Непрошедшее прошлое. Собрание сочинений Шимона Маркиша [The Unpassed Past: Collected Works of Shimon Markish] (in Russian). Vol. 2. Erasmus and His Time. Ed. Zsuzsa Hetényi. Budapest: ELTE MűMű. ISBN 978-963-489-270-0.
- Mikhailov, A. D. (2012). "Edmond Rostand, a contemporary of Proust". Поэтика Пруста [The Poetics of Proust] (in Russian). Moscow: Yazyki Slavyanskoy Kultury. pp. 387–403. ISBN 978-5-9551-0610-6.
- Milchina, Vera (2021). "Another source of Edmond Rostand's Cyrano de Bergerac". И вечные французы. Одиннадцать статей из истории французской и русской литературы [The Eternal French: Eleven Articles from the History of French and Russian Literature]. Scientific Library (in Russian). Moscow: Novoe Literaturnoe Obozrenie. pp. 49–59. ISBN 978-5-4448-1536-6.
- Petneházi, Gábor (2010). "Tirade du nez, or Nasological Remarks on the History of a Friendship" (PDF). Camoenae Hungaricae. 7: 53–59.
- Rostand, Edmond (1997). Сирано де Бержерак [Cyrano de Bergerac]. Literary Monuments (in Russian). Saint Petersburg: Nauka. ISBN 5-02-028332-0.
- Rostand, Edmond (2011). Cyrano de Bergerac: comédie héroïque en cinq actes (in French). Pierre Troullier (ed.). Paris: Belin-Gallimard. p. 352. ISBN 978-2-7011-5640-8.
- Rostand, Edmond (2015). Сирано де Бержерак: героическая комедия в пяти действиях в стихах [Cyrano de Bergerac: A Heroic Comedy in Five Acts in Verse]. World Classics (in Russian). Trans. by E. Baevskaya. Afterword by M. Yasnov. Saint Petersburg: Azbuka. p. 320. ISBN 978-5-389-09821-3.
- Zenkin, S. N. (2018). "§ 25. The linguistic conception of style". Теория литературы. Проблемы и результаты [Theory of Literature: Problems and Results]. Scientific Library (in Russian). Moscow: Novoe Literaturnoe Obozrenie. pp. 197–205. ISBN 978-5-4448-0714-9.
