= Vasily Grossman =

Soviet writer and journalist (1905–1964)

Vasily Grossman Василий Гроссман
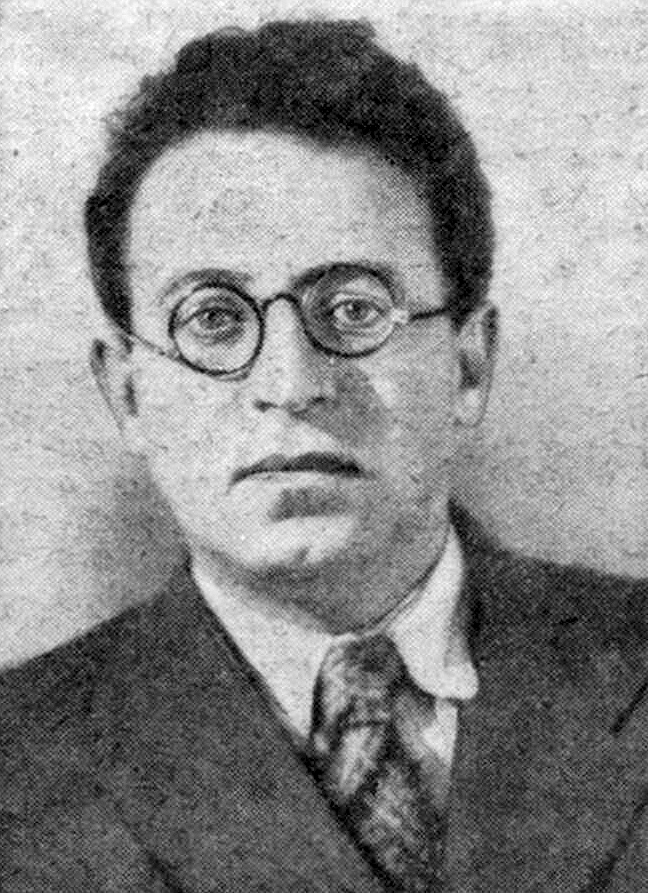
- Photo of Grossman published in Ogonyok (1941)
- Born: Iosif Solomonovich Grossman; 12 December 1905; Berdichev, Kiev Governorate, Russian Empire
- Died: 14 September 1964 (aged 58); Moscow, Soviet Union
- Occupations: Writer, journalist
- Spouses: Anna Petrovna Matsuk (m. 1928; div. 1933) Olga Mikhailovna (m. 1936)
- Writing career
- Period: 1934–1964
- Subjects: Soviet history World War II
- Notable works: Life and Fate; Everything Flows

Vasily Semyonovich Grossman (Russian: Васи́лий Семёнович Гро́ссман; 12 December [O.S. 29 November] 1905 – 14 September 1964) was a Soviet writer and journalist. Born to a Jewish family in Ukraine, then part of the Russian Empire, Grossman trained as a chemical engineer at Moscow State University, earning the nickname Vasya-khimik ("Vasya the Chemist") because of his diligence as a student. Upon graduation, he took a job in Stalino (now Donetsk) in the Donets Basin. In the 1930s he changed careers and began writing full-time, publishing a number of short stories and several novels.

At the outbreak of the Second World War, Grossman was engaged as a war correspondent by the Red Army newspaper Krasnaya Zvezda; he wrote first-hand accounts of the battles of Moscow, Stalingrad, Kursk, and Berlin. Grossman's eyewitness reports of a Nazi extermination camp, following the discovery of Treblinka, were among the earliest accounts of a Nazi death camp by a reporter.

There is some dispute over the extent of the state repression Grossman endured after the war. While he was never arrested, his two major literary works (Life and Fate and Everything Flows) were censored by Nikita Khrushchev's government as anti-Soviet. At the time of Grossman's death from kidney cancer in 1964, these books remained unreleased. Copies were eventually smuggled out of the Soviet Union by a network of dissidents, including Andrei Sakharov and Vladimir Voinovich, and first published in the West in 1980, before appearing in the Soviet Union in 1988.

== Early life and career ==
Born Iosif Solomonovich Grossman in Berdychiv, Ukraine, Russian Empire, into a Jewish family, he did not receive a traditional Jewish education. His father Semyon Osipovich Grossman was a chemical engineer, and his mother Yekaterina Savelievna was a teacher of French. A Russian nanny turned his name Yossya into Russian Vasya (a diminutive of Vasily), which was accepted by the whole family. His father had social-democratic convictions and joined the Mensheviks, and was active in the 1905 Revolution; he helped organise events in Sevastopol. From 1910 to 1912, he lived with his mother in Geneva after his parents had separated. After returning to Berdychiv in 1912, he moved to Kiev in 1914 where, while living with his father, he attended secondary school and later the Kiev Higher Institute of Soviet Education. Young Vasily Grossman idealistically supported the hope of the Russian Revolution of 1917.

In January 1928, Grossman married Anna Petrovna Matsuk; their daughter, named Yekaterina after Grossman's mother, was born two years later. When he had to move to Moscow, she refused to leave her job in Kiev, but in any case, she could not get a permit to stay in Moscow. When he moved to Stalino, she certainly did not want to go; she had started having affairs. Their daughter was sent to live with his mother in Berdychiv.

Grossman began writing short stories while studying chemical engineering at Moscow State University and later continued his literary activity while working running chemical tests at a coal-mining concern in Stalino in the Donbas, and later in a pencil factory. One of his first short stories, "In the Town of Berdichev" (В городе Бердичеве), drew favourable attention and encouragement from Maxim Gorky and Mikhail Bulgakov. The film Commissar (director Aleksandr Askoldov), made in 1967, suppressed by the KGB and released only in 1988, is based on this four-page story.

In the mid-1930s Grossman left his job and committed himself fully to writing. By 1936 he had published two collections of stories and the novel Glyukauf, and in 1937 was accepted into the privileged Union of Writers. His novel Stepan Kol'chugin (published 1937–1940) was nominated for a Stalin prize, but deleted from the list by Stalin himself for alleged Menshevik sympathies.

Grossman's first marriage ended in 1933, and in the summer of 1935 he began an affair with Olga Mikhailovna Guber, the wife of his friend, the writer Boris Guber. Grossman and Olga began living together in October 1935, and they married in May 1936, a few days after Olga and Boris Guber divorced. In 1937 during the Great Purge Boris Guber was arrested, and later Olga was also arrested for failing to denounce her previous husband as an "enemy of the people". Grossman quickly had himself registered as the official guardian of Olga's two sons by Boris Guber, thus saving them from being sent to orphanages. He then wrote to Nikolay Yezhov, the head of the NKVD, pointing out that Olga was now his wife, not Guber's, and that she should not be held responsible for a man from whom she had separated long before his arrest. Grossman's friend, Semyon Lipkin, commented, "In 1937 only a very brave man would have dared to write a letter like this to the State's chief executioner." Olga Guber was released.

== War reporter ==
Grossman with the Red Army in Schwerin, Germany, 1945

When Nazi Germany invaded the Soviet Union in 1941, Grossman's mother was trapped in Berdychiv by the invading German Army, and eventually murdered together with 20,000 to 30,000 other Jews who had not evacuated. Grossman was exempt from military service, but volunteered for the front, where he spent more than 1,000 days. He became a war correspondent for the popular Red Army newspaper Krasnaya Zvezda (Red Star). As the war raged on, he covered its major events, including the Battle of Moscow, the Battle of Stalingrad, the Battle of Kursk and the Battle of Berlin. In addition to war journalism, his novels (such as The People Immortal) were published in newspapers and he came to be regarded as a legendary war hero. The novel Stalingrad was begun during the war and finished in 1952. After a struggle with censors over the book's content, the novel was published in the journal Znamya. It was later renamed For a Just Cause (За правое дело) and heavily edited in republications released after Joseph Stalin's death. A new English translation, with added material from Grossman's politically risky early drafts, was published in 2019 under the original title, Stalingrad. In December 2019 the book was the subject of the series Stalingrad: Destiny of a Novel in BBC Radio 4's Book of the Week.

Grossman described Nazi ethnic cleansing in German-occupied Ukraine and Poland and the liberation by the Red Army of the German Nazi Treblinka and Majdanek extermination camps. He collected some of the first eyewitness accounts—as early as 1943—of what later became known as the Holocaust. His article The Hell of Treblinka (1944) was disseminated at the Nuremberg Trials as evidence for the prosecution.

=== The Hell of Treblinka ===
Grossman interviewed former Sonderkommando inmates who escaped from Treblinka and wrote his manuscript without revealing their identities. He had access to materials already published. Grossman described Treblinka's operation in the first person. Of Josef Hirtreiter, the SS man who served at the reception zone of the Treblinka extermination camp during the arrival of transports, Grossman wrote:

This creature specialized in the killing of children. Evidently endowed with unusual strength, it would suddenly snatch a child out of the crowd, swing him or her about like a cudgel and then either smash their head against the ground or simply tear them in half. When I first heard about this creature—supposedly human, supposedly born of a woman—I could not believe the unthinkable things I was told. But when I heard these stories repeated by eyewitnesses, when I realized that these witnesses saw them as mere details, entirely in keeping with everything else about the hellish regime of Treblinka, then I came to believe that what I had heard was true.

Grossman's description of a physically unlikely method of killing a living human through tearing-by-hand originated from the 1944 memoir of the Treblinka revolt survivor Jankiel Wiernik, where the phrase to "tear the child in half" appeared for the first time. Wiernik himself never worked in the Auffanglager receiving area of the camp where Hirtreiter served, and so was not an eye witness. Wiernik's memoir was published in Warsaw as a clandestine booklet before the war's end, and translated in 1945 as A Year in Treblinka. In his article, Grossman claimed that 3 million people had been killed at Treblinka, the highest estimate ever proposed, rather than the now widely accepted 750,000 to 880,000; this was because of an error made by Grossman when he calculated the number of trains that could arrive at the extermination camp each day.

== Conflict with the Soviet government ==
Grossman participated in the compiling of the Black Book, a project of the Jewish Anti-Fascist Committee to document the crimes of the Holocaust. The post-war suppression of the Black Book by the Soviet state shook him to the core, and he began to question his own loyal support of the Soviet government. First the censors ordered changes in the text to conceal the specifically anti-Jewish character of the atrocities and to downplay the role of Ukrainians who worked with the Nazis as police. Then, in 1948, the Soviet edition of the book was scrapped completely. Semyon Lipkin wrote:

In 1946... I met some close friends, an Ingush and a Balkar, whose families had been deported to Kazakhstan during the war. I told Grossman and he said: "Maybe it was necessary for military reasons." I said: "...Would you say that if they did it to the Jews?" He said that could never happen. Some years later, a virulent article against cosmopolitanism appeared in Pravda. Grossman sent me a note saying I had been right after all. For years Grossman didn't feel very Jewish. The campaign against cosmopolitanism reawoke his Jewishness.

Grossman also criticized collectivization and political repression of peasants that led to the Holodomor tragedy. He wrote that "The decree about grain procurement required that the peasants of Ukraine, the Don and the Kuban be put to death by starvation, put to death along with their little children."

Because of state persecution, only a few of Grossman's post-war works were published during his lifetime. After he submitted for publication his magnum opus, the novel Life and Fate (Жизнь и судьба, 1959), the KGB raided his flat. The manuscripts, carbon copies, notebooks, as well as the typists' copies and even the typewriter ribbons were seized. It has been said by many, including Grossman's translator, Robert Chandler (see, for example his introduction to Life and Fate that the Politburo ideology chief Mikhail Suslov told Grossman that his book could not be published for two or three hundred years. However, Chandler and Yury Bit-Yunan, in Vasily Grossman: Myths and Counter-Myths, say that their research into the notes about that meeting of both Grossman and Suslov show that this was not the case, and in note 2 of that article, Chandler expresses regret for having made the claim.

Grossman wrote to Nikita Khrushchev: "What is the point of me being physically free when the book I dedicated my life to is arrested... I am not renouncing it... I am requesting freedom for my book." However, Life and Fate and his last major novel, Everything Flows (Все течет, 1961) were considered a threat to the Soviet power and remained unpublished. Grossman died in 1964, not knowing whether his greatest work would ever be read by the public.

== Death ==
Grossman died of kidney cancer on 14 September 1964. He was buried at the Troyekurovskoye Cemetery on the edge of Moscow.

== Legacy ==
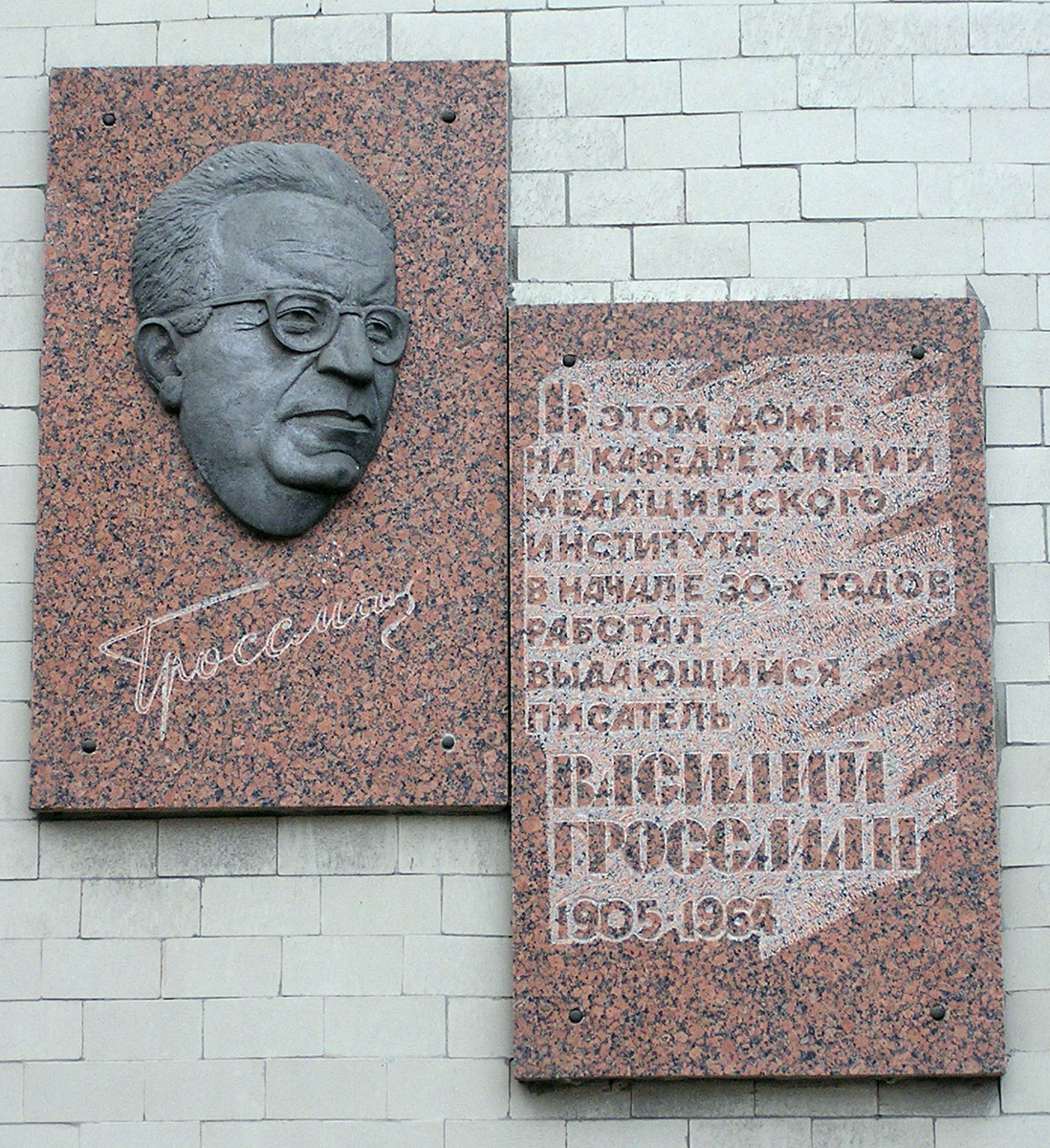
Memorial plaque in Donetsk where Grossman worked in the early 1930s

Life and Fate was first published in Russian in 1980 in Switzerland, thanks to fellow dissidents: the physicist Andrei Sakharov secretly photographed draft pages preserved by Semyon Lipkin, and the writer Vladimir Voinovich smuggled the photographic films abroad. Two dissident researchers, professors and writers Efim Etkind and Shimon Markish, retyped the text from the microfilm, with some mistakes and misreadings due to the bad quality. The book was finally published in the Soviet Union in 1988 after the policy of glasnost was initiated by Mikhail Gorbachev. The text was published again in 1989 after further original manuscripts emerged after the first publication. Everything Flows was also published in the Soviet Union in 1989, and was republished in English, in a new translation by Robert Chandler, in 2009. Life and Fate was first published in English in 1985; a revised English translation by Robert Chandler was published in 2006 and widely praised, being described as "World War II's War and Peace".

Life and Fate is considered to be in part an autobiographical work. Robert Chandler wrote in his introduction to the Harvill edition that its leading character, Viktor Shtrum, "is a portrait of the author himself," reflecting in particular his anguish at the murder of his mother at the Berdichev Ghetto. Chapter 18, a letter from Shtrum's mother, Anna, has been dramatized for the stage and film as The Last Letter (2002), directed by Frederick Wiseman and starring Catherine Samie. Chandler suggests that aspects of the character and experience of Shtrum are based on the physicist Lev Landau. The late novel Everything Flows, in turn, is especially noted for its quiet, unforced, and yet horrifying condemnation of the Soviet totalitarian state: a work in which Grossman, liberated from worries about censors, writes honestly about Soviet history.

Some critics have compared Grossman's novels to the work of Leo Tolstoy.

== Publications ==
- Kolchugin's Youth: A Novel, translated by Rosemary Edmonds (1946). Hutchinsons International Authors Ltd.
- The People Immortal, translated by Elizabeth Donnelly (1943), Moscow, Foreign Languages Publishing House (published in US as No Beautiful Nights, New York, J. Messner (1944) and in U.K. as The People Immortal, London: Hutchinson International Authors (1945)). A new translation by Robert and Elizabeth Chandler, including previously censored passages reinstated by Julia Volohova from Grossman's original typescript, was published in 2022 by NYRB Classics (US edition) and the MacLehose Press (UK edition).
- The Black Book: The Ruthless Murder of Jews by German-Fascist Invaders Throughout the Temporarily-Occupied Regions of the Soviet Union and in the Death Camps of Poland during the War 1941–1945. (originally 1944), by Vasily Grossman and Ilya Ehrenburg (ISBN 0-89604-031-3)
- For a Just Cause (1956), originally titled Stalingrad. Published in the Soviet Union in Russian in 1952. English translation with additional material from Grossman's unpublished manuscripts by Robert and Elizabeth Chandler published under original name Stalingrad by New York Review Books, June 2019, ISBN 9781846555794.
- Life and Fate (1960) (ISBN 0-00-261454-5 - first English translation edition, other editions ISBN 0-09-950616-5; ISBN 1-59017-201-9; ISBN 1-86046-019-4) The novel was praised as a masterpiece in Chandler's 2006 translation.
- Forever Flowing (1972) (European Classics - ISBN 0-8101-1503-4) It was republished as Everything Flows, translated by Robert & Elizabeth Chandler (2010), Harvill Secker and New York Review Books (ISBN 978-1-59017-328-2).
- The Road: Stories, Journalism, and Essays, translated by Robert and Elizabeth Chandler with Olga Mukovnikova, commentary and notes by Robert Chandler with Yury Bit-Yunan, afterword by Fyodor Guber. New York Review Books, 2010, ISBN 978-1-59017-361-9
- A Writer at War: Vasily Grossman with the Red Army, 1941-1945, edited and translated by Antony Beevor and Luba Vinogradova from Grossman's wartime notebooks. New York: Pantheon Books, 2005. ISBN 0-375-424-07-5. Also published as A Writer at War: A Soviet Journalist with the Red Army, 1941-1945. Vintage Canada. ISBN 978-0-307-36378-7. From the Front Line: Stalingrad–Treblinka–Berlin, 1941–45. New York Review Books, 2026.
- An Armenian Sketchbook (written in 1962). Translated by Robert Chandler. New York Review Books Classics, 2013, ISBN 1590176189.
- "In The War" and Other Stories. Translated by Andrew Glikin-Gusinsky. Sovlit.net
- (in Russian) Grossman's publications at lib.ru

== See also ==
- History of the Soviet Union
- History of the Jews in Russia and Soviet Union
- History of the Jews in Ukraine
- Ilya Ehrenburg
- Varlam Shalamov
- Solomon Mikhoels
- Jewish Anti-Fascist Committee
- Doctors' plot
- Stalin and antisemitism
- Gulag
- Samizdat
