= Tirade =

A tirade (French: tirade, from Italian: tirata, meaning a stretch) is a brief and powerful monologue, typically in a drama. It is a long phrase delivered in an elevated tone, notable for its resonance and calculated for external success. In a broader sense, a tirade is any long train of words or sequence of expression on a single theme, especially if it contains censure or reproof.

Due to its loose connection with the development of the drama's action and acting as an extraneous element, the tirade met with condemnation from the ancients. They strictly adhered to the principle of unity of action (semper ad eventum festinat, always hastening to the resolution). However, it found a place in the oratorical addresses of the ancient parabasis.

French tragedy is often imbued with a rhetorical element and filled with tirades. These provided an opportunity for the author to display new aspects of their talent, for the actor to showcase their declamatory art, and for the audience to greet a resonant commonplace with sympathetic applause.

== In satire ==
Criticism of satire has never established firm boundaries between tirade, diatribe and rant; in daily use all three have similar meanings of heated speech directed against someone or something. Kirk Combe has attempted a classification, reserves the status of a literary form for the diatribe alone: it was a genre of ancient popular philosophy with a real afterlife in early satire, whereas a tirade or a rant is simply a manner of speech, a rhetorical device that turns up inside a satirist's larger argument without any fixed shape of its own. When compared to a rant, the tirade follows stricter discipline: it stays trained on one person or group (a rival politician, for example), while a rant spills out as though unrehearsed. Combe stresses that the diatribe deals with ethical questions while tirade and rant only attack, and this is exactly what makes them useful as a device of naked hostility to make the satirist's point. Combe leans on Robert Phiddian's account of the public emotions of satire, on which such passages work by rousing contempt, anger and disgust.

The test case Combe offers is Juvenal's Satire VI. Its nearly 700 lines are an attack on the women of upper-class Rome and against patrician marriage; general moral reflection surfaces only at its margins. The hostility never stops, and for Combe this fixation suggests a "tirade" classification over "diatribe". Not that much hangs on the word, as he himself admits; the attack reads the same under either name.

== Examples of famous theatrical tirades ==
Within a play, certain tirades serve as "bravura pieces" for both the author and the actors, and are anticipated by the audience as a dramatic climax of the performance.

- The tirade where Phaedra declares her love for Hippolytus in act 2, scene 5 of Jean Racine's Phèdre:
  Yes, Prince, I languish, I burn for Theseus (...)
- Don Juan's tirade on hypocrisy in act 5, scene 2 of Molière's Don Juan:
  There is no longer any shame in it now; hypocrisy is a fashionable vice, and all fashionable vices pass for virtues. (...)
- The "tirade of the nose" in act 1, scene 4 of Edmond Rostand's Cyrano de Bergerac:

Ah! no! that is a bit short, young man!
One could say... Oh! God! ... many things in short...
By varying the tone, -for example, look
Aggressive: "Me, Sir, if I had such a nose,
I would have to amputate it at once!"
(...)

- In William Shakespeare's A Midsummer Night's Dream, spoken by Puck to a fairy in act 2, scene 1:

I am that merry wanderer of the night.
I jest to Oberon and make him smile
When I a fat and bean-fed horse beguile,
Neighing in likeness of a filly foal:
And sometime lurk I in a gossip's bowl,
In very likeness of a roasted crab,
And when she drinks, against her lips I bob
And on her wither'd dewlap pour the ale.
(...)

- Khlestakov: The tall-tale tirades of the dandy Khlestakov regarding his imaginary life in Saint Petersburg.

== Sources ==
- Arkady Gornfeld (1890–1907). "Тирада" [Tirade]. Brockhaus and Efron Encyclopedic Dictionary: In 86 Volumes (82 Volumes and 4 Additional Volumes) (in Russian). Vol. XXXIII. St. Petersburg: F. A. Brockhaus. p. 224.
- Koshel, P. (2002). Bolshaya shkolnaya entsiklopediya. Gumanitarnye nauki [Great School Encyclopedia: Humanities] (in Russian). Moscow: OLMA Media Group. p. 222. ISBN 5-224-03215-6.
- Combe, Kirk (2026). "Satiric Emotions: Diatribe/Tirade/Rant". In Wendt, Daniel; Flucher, Elisabeth; Pieper, Vincenz (eds.). Handbuch Satire. Berlin: Springer. pp. 1–7. doi:10.1007/978-3-662-67938-8_43-1. ISBN 978-3-662-67938-8.
- Prokhorov, A. M., ed. (1976). "Тирада" [Tirade]. Great Soviet Encyclopedia (in Russian). Vol. 25 (3rd ed.). Moscow: Sovetskaya Entsiklopediya.
