= The Railway (novel) =

Book by Hamid Ismailov

- Author: Hamid Ismailov
- Translator: Robert Chandler
- Language: Russian
- Genre: Fiction
- Publisher: Vintage Books
- Publication date: 1997
- Publication place: Russia
- English publication date: 2006
- ISBN: 9780099466130

The Railway (Russian: Железная дорога) is one of the more famous novels by Hamid Ismailov. The book was originally written before he left Uzbekistan and was translated into English by Robert Chandler and published in 2006. A Russian edition was published in Moscow in 1997 under the pseudonym Altaer Magdi (Russian: Алтаэр Магди).

== Plot ==
The novel is plotted in Gilas, a fictitious small town on the ancient Silk Route in Uzbekistan. The heart of the novel and the town is a railway station, which sets the connection between the town and the greater world. Gilas has people from all over - Armenians, Kurds, Persians, Ukrainians, Jews, Chechens, Koreans, gypsies, Russians etc and the novel tells the stories of some of them. The book describes the dramatic changes that was felt in the Central Asia in early twentieth century.

== Characters ==
- Mefody-Jurisprudence -an alcoholic intellectual
- Father Loann -a Russian priest
- Kara-Musayev the younger-the chief of Police
- Umarali-Moneybags -an old moneylender
