= Stalingrad (Grossman novel) =

1952 novel by Vasily Grossman

Stalingrad / For a Just Cause
- Author: Vasily Grossman
- Original title: За правое дело / Сталинград
- Translator: Robert and Elizabeth Chandler
- Language: Russian
- Genre: Socrealist novel
- Publication date: 1952
- Publication place: Soviet Union
- English publication date: 2019
- Followed by: Life and Fate

For a Just Cause (Russian: За правое дело, romanized: Za pravoye delo) is a socrealist novel by Russian writer Vasily Grossman, first published in 1952. A revised English translation, which includes additional material from Grossman's unpublished manuscripts, was published under the author's preferred title, Stalingrad, in 2019. The novel is the predecessor to Grossman's more widely read Life and Fate.

== Historical context ==
Most of the events of Stalingrad take place in the Soviet Union starting in the months before Operation Barbarossa, in mid-September 1941, there is also a focus on the first month of the Battle of Stalingrad in July 1942.

The book describes the shock of the Operation Barbarossa invasion for many of the novel's characters, and how the German invasion completely altered life for citizens of the USSR at that time.

The book follows the members and friends of the Shaposhnikov family as they work and then fight or flee from Western SSRs to Stalingrad by 1942. The German bombing of Stalingrad began on 23 August 1942, with 1600 bomber sorties dropping high explosives and incendiaries, inflicting massive damage on the city. Some of Grossman's characters are allowed to flee the city, some die fleeing, some fight or work while the immense battle continues around them.

== Background ==
Grossman wrote Stalingrad starting in 1943. The book was extensively edited through a number of editions. Grossman intended his novel to be the "War and Peace" of World War II ("The Great Patriotic War" in Soviet parlance.) It was published in parts at first but was subject to extensive political censorship. While Joseph Stalin ruled, Grossman could not criticize Stalin or the Soviet central command. As Stalin's government shifted, Grossman had to add or subtract elements of the book. He added new pieces to more broadly cover the Soviet war experiences, such as mining and food production; he subtracted parts that too strongly lauded Jewish contributions. By 1953, Stalin had become paranoid over a Jewish conspiracy; he feared that Jewish doctors were trying to assassinate him. Grossman, being Jewish himself, was fortunate to escape arrest. When Stalin died, Grossman's novel was again edited and republished in Russian as "Part 1" of Grossman's "War and Peace" recounting the Great Patriotic War.

Stalingrad, as translated into English by Robert and Elizabeth Chandler, tried to provide a comprehensive version of Grossman's texts. The Chandlers' editing rules were based on trying to surmise Grossman's wishes seeking to include any text that Grossman "liked", even if it was on a topic that was forced on him by outside forces. The Chandlers removed text that they believed would cause a plot conflict, or that Grossman himself had deleted. The result is a translation that can be seen as "designed by committee". There are many plot lines, many of which are left unresolved or unmentioned for the rest of the novel. This near-1000-page Stalingrad is only the prelude to his more popular second novel Life and Fate, written in 1959, well after Stalin's death, and first published in 1980. The second novel resolves the majority of the incomplete plot lines from Stalingrad.

== Main characters ==
Grossman has a plot line to emphasize each key Soviet strength. However, in Stalingrad, these roles are not fully developed when it ends in mid-September 1942. The characters are loosely connected to the Shaposhnikov family of Stalingrad.

- Alexandra Vladimirovna Shaposhnikov: around 65 years old. Matriarch "granny" (grandmother). Widowed, bacteriology teacher and chemist, headed a small lab to monitor factory working conditions, loved people and her work.
- Ludmilla Nikolaevna Shaposhnikov: around 46 years old, eldest daughter of Alexandra. Nearly completed a Ph.D. in Chemistry. Briefly married to renegade-type named Abarchuk, had one son ("Tolya") and was divorced. Remarried Victor Shtrum, had a daughter ("Nadya") and tended house until the war started. Withdrew 400 miles east to Kazan, getting a job as a factory chemist.
- Victor Pavlovich Shtrum: Ludmila's current husband of 20 years, a brilliant physicist, running a big experiment needing high quality steel in Moscow in 1942. He invented and deployed a new way to control steel-alloy smelting.
- "Tolya" Lt. Anatoly Shaposhnikov: around 22 years old. Ludmila's son by Abarchuk; as the war began, he volunteered and was commissioned a Lieutenant in Artillery. In this book he is mentioned mainly as a worry for his mother Ludmila.
- "Nadya" Shaposhnikov: around 18 years old. Ludmila's daughter, by Shtrum. She is mentioned only as a high school student.
- Marusya Spiridonova: around 43 years old. Alexandra's second (middle) daughter who ran a children's hospital in Stalingrad. She was among those allowed to evacuate across the Volga.
- Stepan Fyodorovich Spiridonov: around 50 years old. Marusya's husband, the director of the main Stalingrad coal-power generating station. This station remained open through the first month of the battle, despite daily bombing, shelling and direct assaults.
- Vera Spiridonova: around 20 years old. The daughter of Marusya and Stepan who worked as a nurse in the hospital.
- Sergeant Viktorov: around 22 years old. A fighter pilot in Vera's hospital recovering from crash wounds. He is in love with Vera.
- Dmitry Shaposhnikov: around 40 years old. Alexandra's son, arrested by Russian police in 1937, sentenced to help build the White Sea Canal. Rarely mentioned in this volume.
- Seryozha Shaposhnikov: around 17 years old, Dmitry's son, adopted by Alexandra after Dmitry's arrest; joined the Stalingrad militia (lied about age) in July 1942. He was assigned to a mortar squad commanded by a martinette named Kryakin. His squad included the scrounger "deserter" Gradusov, the smart and confident Komsomol engineer Chentsov, and the over-age veteran carpenter Polyakov.
- "Zhenya" Yevgenia Nikolaevna Shaposhnikov: around 26 years old. Alexandra's third (and youngest) daughter, an attractive art/dance student in Moscow who had married and the divorced Colonel Krymov. She had returned to the "safety" of Stalingrad during the retreats of 1941.
- Krymov (Nikolay Grigorievich): around 45 years old, Zhenya's ex-husband. He fought in 1918-22 civil war and was reassigned as a Red Army Political commissar before this war. After being surrounded in the 1941 blitz in western Ukraine, Krymov led 200 soldiers and civilians on a heroic and desperate fighting retreat through 500 km of German-held territory. He became a key leader in the Stalingrad defense.
- Novikov (Colonel Pyotr Pavlovich): spends a lot of the 1942 summer waiting to be assigned and was eventually given a tank corps command. He hoped to marry Zhenya.
- Ivan Novikov (Novikov's brother): a coal mine shaft driller, providing heroic quantities of high-quality coal to enable Russian steel quality. His story was included by the request of Soviet politicians, to represent the sacrifices of workers.
- Mostovskoy (Mikhail Sidorovich): around 65 years old, a longtime Bolshevik, who knew Alexandra even in 1910 when he was a clandestine Communist organizer. He fought in the 1917-1922 Russian Civil War; at least part of that time he was a guerilla behind the White movement lines.
- Andreyev (Pavel Andreyevich): around 68 years old, an old friend of Alexandra and the best worker in the Krasny Oktyabr (steel plant).
- Senior Lieutenant Filyashkin: around 22 years old, he is not related to the other characters. His story is the true story of a key episode in the battle. His actual name was Lieutenant Anton Kuzmich Dragan.
