= Robert Chandler (translator) =

British poet and literary translator

Robert Chandler (born 1953) is a British poet and literary translator. He is the editor of Russian Short Stories from Pushkin to Buida (Penguin) and the author of the short biography of Alexander Pushkin (Hesperus). He is also the editor of the literary magazine Cardinal Points.

His translations include numerous works by Andrei Platonov, Vasily Grossman's Stalingrad (For a Just Cause), Life and Fate and The People Immortal (as well as the novel Everything Flows, short stories, essays and war journalism), and Pushkin's The Captain's Daughter. Chandler's co-translation of Platonov's Soul was chosen in 2004 as “best translation of the year from a Slavonic language” by the American Association of Teachers of Slavic and East European Languages (AATSEEL). His translation of Hamid Ismailov’s The Railway won the AATSEEL prize for Best Translation into English in 2007, and received a special commendation from the judges of the 2007 Rossica Translation Prize. In 2016 he published a translation of Teffi's memoir of the first days after the Russian Revolution, Memories: from Moscow to the Black Sea (NYRB). Chandler’s translations of Sappho and Guillaume Apollinaire are published in the Everyman’s Poetry series.
