= Hamid Ismailov =

Uzbek author

Hamid Ismailov Hamid Ismoilov Ҳамид Исмоилов
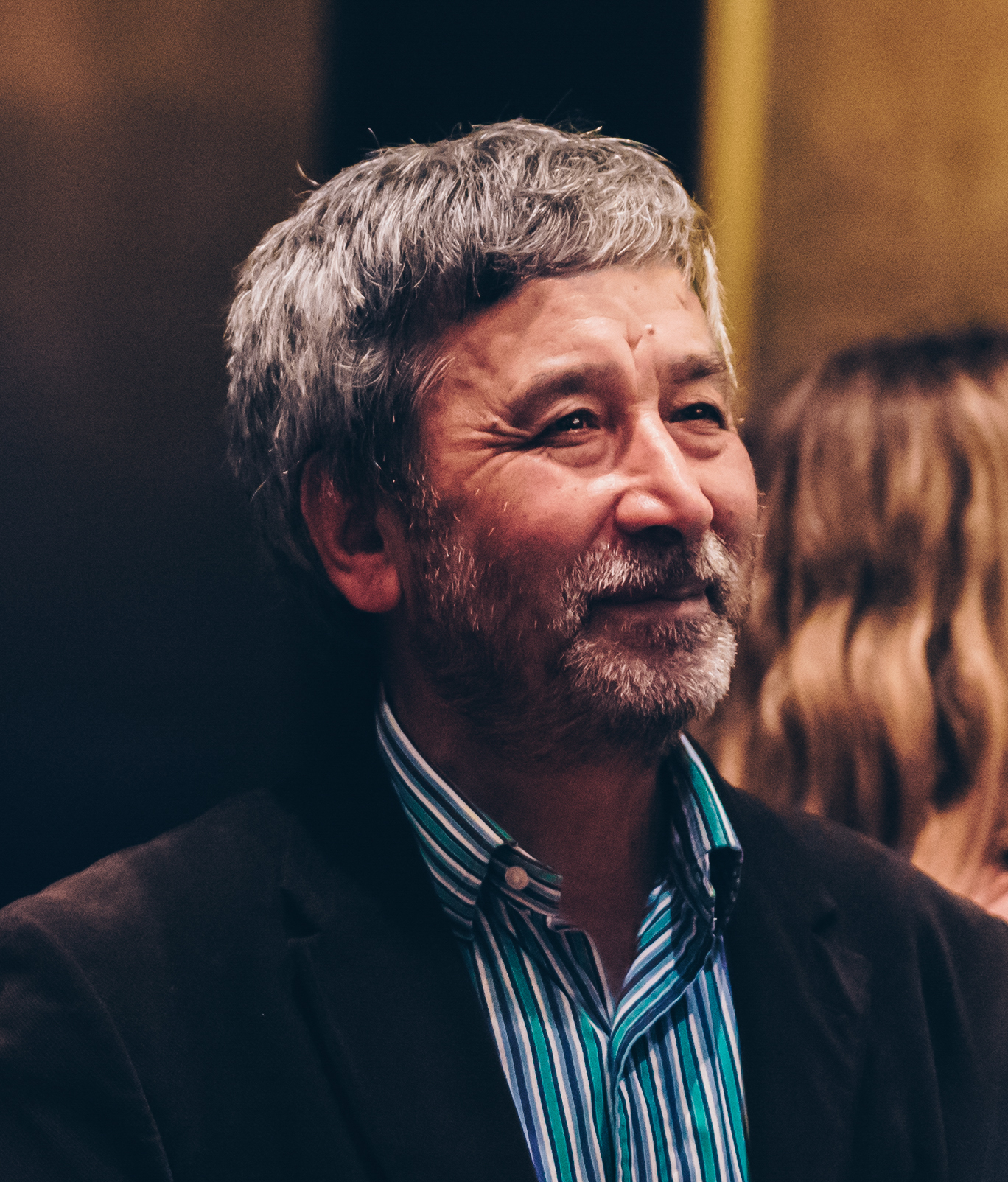
- Ismailov in 2018
- Born: 5 May 1954 (age 72); Tokmok, Kyrgyz SSR, Soviet Union
- Occupations: poet, novelist and translator
- Writing career
- Notable work: The Railway (1997)

Hamid Ismailov (Russian: Хамид Исмайлов; Uzbek: Hamid Ismoilov / Ҳамид Исмоилов or Абдулҳамид Исмоил; born May 5, 1954) is an Uzbek journalist and writer, who was forced to flee Uzbekistan in 1992 to the United Kingdom, where he took a job with the BBC World Service. He left the BBC on 30 April 2019 after 25 years of service. Born in Tokmok, Kyrgyzstan his works are banned in Uzbekistan.

== Life and career ==
Ismailov graduated from the military school of communication and later several departments of Tashkent University (Biology, Law, Management)

Ismailov has published dozens of books in Uzbek, Russian, French, German, Turkish and other languages. Among them books of poetry: "Сад" (Garden) (1987), "Пустыня" (Desert) (1988); of visual poetry: "Post Faustum" (1990), "Книга Отсутстви" (1992); novels "Собрание Утончённых" (1988), Le vagabond flamboyant (1993), Hay-ibn-Yakzan (2001), Hostage to Celestial Turks (2003), "Дорога к смерти больше чем смерть" (The road to death is bigger than death) (2005), and many others. He has translated Russian and Western classics into Uzbek, and Uzbek and Persian classics into Russian and some Western languages.

At the end of the 1980s he created a fictional literary group 'Conference of Refined', consisting of successfully published and acclaimed heteronym poets, philosophers, literary critics, writers and translators. During the same period, he wrote a great number of academic articles mostly on literature and Uzbek mentality, which later he placed on the Academia website.

At the beginning of the 1990s, Ismailov collaborated with French composer Michel Karsky in creating several examples of sonic or musical poetry pieces like 'Babylon eclatee' or 'Hourglass/Le pas dernier'

Ismailov's novel The Railway (Russian: Железная дорога), originally written before he left Uzbekistan, was the first to be translated into English, by Robert Chandler, and was published in 2006. A Russian edition was published in Moscow in 1997 under the pseudonym Altaer Magdi (Russian: Алтаэр Магди). Another novel, A Poet and Bin-Laden (English translation of "Дорога к смерти больше чем смерть"), translated by Andrew Bromfield, was published in September 2012. His triptych of novels, "Мбобо", in English The Underground (published worldwide by Restless Book, Googling for Soul, and Two Lost to Life have also been translated into English. His book "The Dead Lake" (English translation of "Вундеркинд Ержан" by Andrew Bromfield) was published by Peirene Press early in 2014. His novel "The Devils' Dance", which was initially published in Uzbek, chapter by chapter, on Facebook, was acquired and published by Tilted Axis Press in 2018. It won the EBRD Literary Prize in 2019. His novel "Manaschi", translated into English by Donald Rayfield, was published by Tilted Axis Press in 2021 (the book has not been published in the original Uzbek).

On 30 April 2010, the BBC announced Ismailov's appointment as Writer in Residence for BBC World Service for two years. The blog was launched on 10 May 2010. On the 31 December 2014 Hamid Ismailov announced on his Facebook and Twitter accounts that he stops his tenure which lasted 4,5 years. In June 2012, Ismailov represented Uzbekistan at the Poetry Parnassus in London. He took part in many literary festivals, including Hay , Edinburgh , Brooklyn , Berlin , Lahore and many others. In 2022 he had a US Universities literary tour, which started with a Retrospective Symposium of his work at Yale University . He gave lectures at a number of universities, including Ann Arbor , Chicago , Berkeley , Stanford and others. His nearly complete collection of Uzbek poems «Шунчаки» (‘By the by’), was published as an open-access e-book by Prague Library in 2026 and is available for public download .

== Exile and ban ==
Hamid fled Uzbekistan in 1992 after the Islam Karimov regime opened a criminal case against Ismailov. The authorities said Ismailov was trying to overthrow the government and received threats against his family and attacks on his home. His works are still banned in the country. He is a vocal critic of the country's government and its poor human rights record and censorship.

== Works ==
=== Poetry ===
- Сад (Garden) (1987)
- Пустыня (Desert) (1988)
- Post Faustum (1990)
- Книга Отсутстви (1992)
- Шунчаки (‘By the by’) in Uzbek (Prague Library, 2026)

=== Novels ===
- Собрание Утончённых (Conference of the Refined, 1988)
- Железная дорога (1997). The Railway, trans. Robert Chandler (2006) - won the AATSEEL prize and a Rossica special commendation
- Hay-ibn-Yakzan (2001). Of Strangers and Bees, trans. Shelley Fairweather-Vega (2019)
- Hostage to Celestial Turks (2003, as Nouman Smyles)
- Googling for Soul (2004), a novel in short stories, (Trans. Shelley Fairweather-Vega, Dani Ismailov, Irina Buss-Zolotareva, Andrew Bromfield, Glagoslav, 2026)
- Дорога к смерти больше чем смерть (lit. "The Road to Death Is More Than Death", 2005). A Poet and Bin-Laden, trans. Andrew Bromfield (2012)
- Мбобо (2009). The Underground, trans. Carol Ermakova (2015) - was listed among “10 best novels set in Russia” by The Guardian and recognised as one of the best Russian novels of the 21st century by Continent
- Вундеркинд Ержан (lit. "Wunderkind Yerzhan", 2011). The Dead Lake, trans. Andrew Bromfield (2014) - was shortlisted for the Independent Foreign Fiction Prize and named a Book of the Year by both The Guardian and The Independent, longlisted for The Dublin International Literary Prize
- Jinlar basmi yoxud katta o'yin (2012). The Devil's Dance, trans. Donald Rayfield and John Farndon (2018) - won the EBRD Literature Prize
- Gaia, Queen of Ants, trans. Shelley Fairweather-Vega (2020)
- Amber or Good Morning, Midnight (2020, unpublished)
- Manaschi, trans. Donald Rayfield (2021) - was a finalist for the Jan Michalski Prize and shortlisted for the EBRD Literature Prize
- Русская Матрёшка (Russian Matryoshka, to be published by Matthes&Seitz in German in 2027)
- Bizkim - komputerlar, yo dunyoning eng go’zal shoiri (We Computers: A Ghazal Novel, trans. Shelley Fairweather-Vega, published 2025 by Yale University Press) - was a finalist for the National Book Award and shortlisted for the EBRD Literature Prize
- Туш тили/Tush Tili (to be published)
- Scottish Dances or Shestory© of a Whirling Ballerina (2026, in Uzbek, being published on Telegram, to be translated and published by Yale University Press in 2027 as Fire Dances)
- Esse Homo Sovieticus - tetralogy, consisting of Tarantula's Bite, Mother, Daughter and Sinful Soul, Conference of Refined and The Fearsome Dnieper (not translated and not published yet).

=== Translation ===
- Mashrab: Le Vagabond Flamboyant (translated from the Uzbek into French with J.-P.Balpe, 1993)
- Alisher Navoi “Ghazales” (translated from the Uzbek into French with J.-P.Balpe, 1993)
- ”Anthologie de la Poesie d’Ouzbekistan” (in 2 volumes, translated from the Uzbek into French with J.-P.Balpe, 2008)
