= Life and Fate =

1959 novel by Vasily Grossman

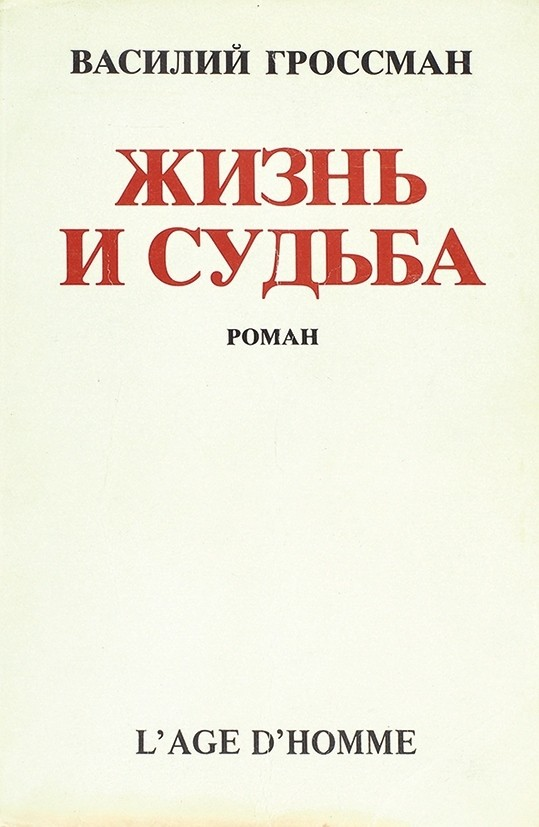
- Author: Vasily Grossman
- Original title: Жизнь и судьба
- Translator: Robert Chandler
- Language: Russian
- Genre: Historical novel, war, philosophical, political fiction
- Publisher: L'Age d'homme (1980), NYRB Classics (2006)
- Publication date: 1980
- Publication place: written in the Soviet Union, first published in the West
- Media type: Print
- Pages: 896
- ISBN: 1590172019
- Preceded by: Stalingrad (1952)
- Followed by: Everything Flows (1980)

Life and Fate (Russian: Жизнь и судьба, romanized: Zhizn' i sud'ba) is a novel by Vasily Grossman. Written in the Soviet Union in 1959, it narrates the story of the family of a Soviet physicist, Viktor Shtrum, during the Great Patriotic War, which is depicted as the struggle between two comparable totalitarian states. A multi-faceted novel, one of its main themes is the tragedy of the common people, who have to fight both the invaders and the totalitarianism of their own state. In 2021, the critic and editor Robert Gottlieb, writing in The New York Times, referred to Life and Fate as "the most impressive novel written since World War II."

Vasily Grossman, a Ukrainian Jew, was rejected for military service in 1941 and became a correspondent for the Soviet military paper Krasnaya Zvezda. He spent approximately 1,000 days on the front lines, roughly three of the four years of the conflict between the Germans and Soviets. He was one of the first journalists to write about the genocide of the Jewish people in Eastern Europe and was present at many famous battles. Life and Fate was his defining achievement, its writing in part motivated by guilt over the death of his mother in the Berdychiv massacre at Berdychiv (UkSSR) in September 1941.

Life and Fate is technically the second half of the author's conceived two-part book under the same title, with the first half published in 1952 under the title For A Just Cause. Although the first half, written by Grossman during the rule of Joseph Stalin, expresses loyalty to the regime, Life and Fate shows the political disillusion of the protagonist and sharply criticises Stalinism. For that reason, the manuscript was censored in the Soviet Union at the time and was only published in the 1980s, nearly two decades after Grossman's death, first in the West and then on Russian soil under glasnost.

== Plot summary ==
Life and Fate is a sprawling account of life on the Eastern Front, with countless plotlines taking place simultaneously all across Russia and Eastern Europe. Although each story has a linear progression, the events are not necessarily presented in chronological order. Grossman will, for example, introduce a character, then ignore that character for hundreds of pages, and then return to recount events that took place the very next day. It is difficult to summarize the novel, but the plot can be boiled down to three basic plotlines: the Shtrum/Shaposhnikov family, the Battle of Stalingrad, and life in the prison camps of Soviet Russia and Nazi Germany. Although Life and Fate is divided into three parts, each of these plotlines is featured in each section.

Viktor Shtrum is a brilliant physicist who, with his wife, Lyudmila, and daughter, Nadya, has been evacuated from Moscow to Kazan. He is experiencing great difficulty with his work, as well as with his family. He receives a letter from his mother from inside a Nazi Jewish ghetto informing him that she is soon to be killed by the Germans. Lyudmila, meanwhile, goes to visit her son from her first marriage, Tolya, in an army hospital, but he dies before her arrival. When she returns to Kazan, she is extremely detached and seems still to be expecting Tolya's return. Viktor finds himself engaging in anti-Soviet conversations at the home of his colleague, Sokolov, partly to impress Sokolov's wife, Marya (Lyudmila's only friend). He consistently compares political situations to physics, and remarks that fascism (Nazism) (Note: In Soviet parlance the terms "fascism/fascists" commonly referred to Nazi Germany.) and Stalinism are not so different. He later regrets these discussions out of fear that he will be denounced, an indiscretion that plagues his decision-making throughout the novel.

Suddenly, Viktor makes a huge mathematical breakthrough, solving the issues that had hindered his experiments. Viktor's colleagues are slow to respond, but eventually come to accept the genius of his discovery. After moving back to Moscow, however, the higher-ups begin to criticize his discoveries as being anti-Leninist and attacking his Jewish identity. Viktor, however, refuses to publicly repent and is forced to resign. He fears that he will be arrested, but then receives a call from Stalin himself (presumably because Stalin had sensed the military importance of nuclear research) that completely and immediately reverses his fortune. Later, he signs a letter denouncing two innocent men and is subsequently racked by guilt. The last details about Viktor regard his unconsummated affair with Marya.

The events recounted at Stalingrad center on Yevghenia Shaposhnikova (Lyudmila's sister), Krymov (her former husband), and Novikov (her lover). After reconnecting with Novikov, Yevghenia evacuates to Kuibyshev. Novikov, the commander of a Soviet tank corps, meets General Nyeudobnov and Political Commissar Getmanov, both of whom are Party hacks. Together they begin planning the counter-assault on Stalingrad. Novikov delays the start of the assault for fear of unnecessarily sacrificing his men. Getmanov later denounces Novikov and he is summoned for trial, even though the tank attack was a complete success.

Meanwhile, Krymov, a Political Commissar, is sent to investigate House 6/1, where a tiny group of soldiers have held back the Germans for weeks, even though they are completely surrounded and cut off from all supplies. Grekov, the commanding officer, refuses to send reports to HQ, and is disdainful of Krymov's rhetoric. He later wounds Krymov in his sleep, causing him to be evacuated from the house. Soon after, House 6/1 is completely leveled by German bombs. Krymov, a staunch Communist, is then accused of being a traitor and is sent to Lubyanka Prison in Moscow, where he is beaten and forced to confess. Yevghenia decides not to marry Novikov and goes to Moscow to try and visit Krymov. He receives a package from her and realizes that he still loves her but may never be released from prison.

The sections that take place in the camps have few recurring characters, with the exception of Mostovskoy, an old Bolshevik who takes part in a plot to rebel against the Germans, but is dismayed by the prevailing lack of faith in communism. His interrogator, Sturmbannführer Liss, asserts that fascism and communism are two sides of the same coin, which upsets Mostovskoy greatly. He is later killed by the Germans for his part in the uprising. In one scene, Liss tells Mostovskoy that both Stalin and Hitler are the leaders of qualitatively new formation: "When we look at each other's faces, we see not only a hated face; we see the mirror reflection. ... Don't you recognize yourself, your [strong] will in us?" Grossman also focuses on Sofya Levinton, a Jewish woman on her way to a Nazi concentration camp.

The final chapter introduces a set of characters who remain anonymous: an elderly widow observing her tenants, a wounded army officer recently discharged from hospital, his wife and their young daughter. It is implied, however, that the officer returning to his family is Major Byerozkin, a recurring character from Stalingrad who is shown to be a kind man struggling to retain his humanity.

== Main characters ==
Viktor Pavlovich Shtrum
Viktor Shtrum is the primary figure in Grossman's novel, largely based on the author himself. Although there are a multitude of characters in Life and Fate, much of the novel's plot revolves around Shtrum and his family. Shtrum is married to Lyudmila. He works as a nuclear physicist and is a member of the Academy of Sciences. A crucial aspect of Shtrum's character is his academic work. He is constantly thinking about his exploration of nuclear physics. This obsession with his work is obvious from the very start of the novel through the thoughts of Lyudmila, from whom he has drawn apart. Before the war, Shtrum's family had been living in Moscow, but the city's evacuation caused them to move into Kazan. Throughout the novel, Shtrum hints at his ambivalent feelings toward the state, becoming increasingly disillusioned with Stalin's regime. He is at times an unsympathetic man – self-absorbed, irritable, difficult to live with – yet he is also deeply human, struggling to remain true to himself while navigating the innumerable moral quandaries of life in Soviet society. The war also forces Shtrum to come to terms with his Jewish heritage, largely through the traumatic loss of his mother, who was murdered by the Nazis in Ukraine. Viktor learns this through her last letter to him; Grossman has her suffer the same fate as his own mother, who was killed in similar circumstances. This passage is both one of the most iconic and the most devastating in the novel. As the story goes on, Viktor also becomes increasingly aware of the latent anti-Semitism of the world in which he lives.
Lyudmila ('Lyuda') Nikolaevna Shaposhnikova
Lyudmila is married to Viktor Shtrum and has a daughter with him named Nadya. This is her second marriage. She was originally married to Abarchuk, who has been sent to a Soviet labor camp. In the beginning of the novel, it is clear that Lyudmila and Viktor have drifted apart. Although their estrangement is not expressed openly by either character, it is evident through Lyudmila's discussion of her eldest son, Tolya, whom she had with Abarchuk. Lyudmila discusses how Viktor and his mother, Anna Semyonovna, always showed a preference to Nadya and ignored Tolya. Lyudmila describes this best when she says “Nadya, Nadya, Nadya ... Nadya's got Viktor's eyes ... Nadya's absent-minded, Nadya's quick-witted, Nadya's very thoughtful.” Lyudmila's separation and apathy towards Viktor and Nadya grow greater after the death of Tolya. This plot thread is one of the first to occur in the novel, and Grossman plunges us into Lyuda's consciousness as she struggles to come to terms with the untimely loss of her son. For a long time afterward, she talks to Tolya constantly, sometimes out loud, a habit which Viktor finds hard to cope with.
Yevgenia ('Zhenya') Nikolaevna Shaposhnikova
Yevgenia is Lyudmila's younger sister. She was originally married to Nikolay Grigorevich Krymov, but when the reader is introduced to her in the novel, she is in a relationship with Colonel Pyotr Pavlovich Novikov. After moving to Kuibyshev, Yevgenia lives with an old German woman named Jenny Genrikovna, who had once worked as the Shaposhnikov family's governess. Yevgenia had a good relationship with Jenny, but after the old woman is deported, along with other Germans living in Kuibyshev, Yevgenia lives alone. Although she is a beautiful, charming, and highly intelligent woman, Yevgenia has much trouble acquiring a residence permit or a ration card. After many run-ins with Grishin, the head of the passport department, she is finally able to get these documents using societal connections. She receives aid in acquiring official documentation from Limonov, a man of letters, and Lieutenant Colonel Rizin, her boss at the design office – both of whom are romantically interested in her. As the novel goes on, Zhenya shows herself to be both a strong and profoundly sympathetic character.
Alexandra Vladimirovna
Alexandra is mother of Lyudmila and Yevgenia.

Dementiy Trifonovich Getmanov
Getmanov is the secretary of an obkom and is appointed commissar to Novikov's tank corps. He is described as having large and distinct features: “his shaggy, graying head, his broad forehead, and his fleshy nose.” Getmanov is married to Galina Terentyevna. He has two daughters and a young son. His family lives in Ufa, where his comrades take care of them when Getmanov is away. Getmanov comes off as a strong supporter of the Party. His prime objective in life is to move up in the Party's hierarchy, regardless of the cost to others. Thus, he is very cautious about what he says and what those who are associated with him say, because he does not want to offend the Party or Stalin in any way. This is obvious when he is discussing politics with his friends before leaving for the front. When one man discusses how his young son once abused a picture of Stalin, Getmanov is overly critical and says that this behavior, even from a youngster, should not be tolerated. Getmanov is also quite arrogant. He feels insulted at being appointed the commissar to only a tank corps. It may be possible to see Getmanov as a portrait of Khrushchev, who had been chief political officer during the battle for Stalingrad.
Abarchuk
Abarchuk is Lyudmila's first husband. He was arrested in 1937 and sent to the gulag. Abarchuk is a strong supporter of the Party. He feels as though he has been wrongly imprisoned, yet does not fault the Party for its actions. He believes that such erroneous arrests are justifiable in the large scheme of party stability. Abarchuk works with tools and materials in the camp. He works with a criminal named Barkhatov, who blackmails many people and even kills one of Abarchuk's friends, Abrasha Rubin. Abarchuk's actions are shaped by his need of approval by the Party. He refuses to even allow Tolya to take his surname, for Abarchuk believes that this might hurt his standing and party image. He insists on doing what he sees as his duty to the state by denouncing Barkhatov, even though this will likely cost him his life.
Pyotr Lavrentyevich Sokolov
Sokolov is a mathematician in Viktor's laboratory. In the beginning of the novel, Sokolov and Viktor are good friends. They love talking about their academic work and often get together at Sokolov's home to discuss life and politics. In general, however, Sokolov is more cautious than Viktor; it is only at the end of the novel that he finally dares to risk his social position for the sake of his convictions. It is implied, too, that he resents Victor's scientific breakthrough slightly. Furthermore, as the novel progresses, it is evident that Viktor and Marya Ivanovna, Sokolov's wife, have feelings for each other. As Sokolov becomes aware of this, his relationship with Viktor cools somewhat.
Mikhail Sidorovich Mostovskoy
Mostovskoy is an Old Bolshevik in a German concentration camp. He is the first major character that the reader is introduced to and he appears in the very beginning of the novel. Mostovskoy was involved in the revolution of 1917 and had strong ties to the Communist Party, having worked side by side with Lenin. Although the living conditions in the camp are unspeakable, Mostovskoy is reasonable and optimistic. He says that the great mixture of prisoners in the camps, all from different ethnic, political and religious backgrounds, leads to an interesting environment. He can use his knowledge of foreign languages in the camp and he can attempt to understand new perspectives. Those inside the camp, including Mostovskoy, are extremely interested in what is going on in the war. Grossman uses Mostovskoy's character to reveal the philosophical tension that pervaded Europe during World War II. Mostovskoy is constantly involved in philosophical arguments with fellow prisoners such as Major Yershov and Ikonnikov, a former Tolstoyan. He is eventually singled out by the German officer Liss for a strange series of one-on-one conversations, during which Liss holds forth regarding what he sees as the essential similarities between Stalinism and Nazism. Mostovskoy is disturbed, but remains defiant, choosing to go to his death in a doomed prisoners' rebellion.
Sofya Osipovna Levinton
When the reader first meets Levinton, she is in a train on the way to a German death camp. We later find out that she is an army doctor and an old friend of Yevgenia's. On the train, Levinton meets a six-year-old boy named David. Sent to spend the summer with his grandmother, he was left cut off from his mother in Moscow after the rapid German advance through Ukraine. Levinton realizes that David's grandmother died soon after all the Jews were herded into the ghetto and that he has no relatives with him in the transport. Over the course of the novel, Levinton grows to love David as a son. When, at the camp, the Germans offer to spare certain prisoners of value (such as doctors), she does not save herself; but rather, she stays with David and heads with him to the gas chamber to be murdered together. This sequence of events in Life and Fate is especially powerful. It demonstrates how human compassion can rise above the atrocities that defined World War II.
Captain Grekov
Grekov is the 'house-manager' in House 6/1 – a Soviet stronghold surrounded by German troops. Grekov's superlative bravery, skill, and devotion to the fight are portrayed in an idealized manner. The men in House 6/1 look on Katya, the young radio operator posted to the building, in the disturbingly predatory way shown in the novel to be prevalent in both armies. Yet Grekov, assumed by all to have a kind of leader’s right to sexually possess the young woman, behaves honourably, sending her out of the building unharmed before the final German assault that will kill them all. A kind of gruff chivalry is added to his other virtues. As a courageous and resourceful soldier, he inspires total devotion in his men, to the alarm of Krymov, who sees this as subversive. Tension forms between Krymov and Grekov as the novel progresses, because Grekov desires to act independently, and is deeply suspicious of the repressive state bureaucracy that Krymov represents. Although Krymov admires Grekov up to a point, and is eager to come to an understanding with him – albeit on the state's terms – it is heavily implied that the house manager ends up wounding him in order to have him evacuated.
Nikolay Grigorevich Krymov
Krymov is Yevgenia's former husband. He is the commissar posted to House 6/1. Krymov seems to be a "good communist", with a history of near-fanatical ideological commitment to the Party. Indeed, his perceived callousness in this regard caused Yevgenia to leave him. However, he grows progressively more disillusioned as the novel goes on. Furthermore, he worked alongside Mostovskoy in the earliest days of the Bolshevik Party, placing him in a compromising position due to his association with various now-discredited figures. Thus, he must watch everything that he does and says. Eventually, a careless comment on the part of Novikov provides the impetus for Krymov's arrest and incarceration, whereupon every politically sensitive detail of his past is turned against him. Despite extensive torture, Krymov consistently refuses to confess to a fabricated series of treasonous acts. Although Yevgenia believes herself to be over Krymov, she constantly thinks about him, and ends up going back to him despite his arrest.
Colonel Pyotr Pavlovich Novikov
Novikov, Yevgenia's lover, is the commanding officer of a tank corps. As such, he participates in the vital pincer movement which ultimately secures the Red Army's victory at Stalingrad. At the front, Novikov works with Getmanov, to whom he rashly lets slip a compromising detail about Krymov's past which Yevgenia had confided in him. Getmanov seizes upon this and reports Krymov, with devastating consequences. Until this point, the young man had hoped to marry Yevgenia, with whom he is infatuated, although the two don't appear to have very much in common. While he believes that he is getting closer to her, the reader realizes that Yevgenia is slowly drifting away from him in favour of Krymov.

== Historical context ==
Most of the events of Life and Fate take place in the Soviet Union during the late autumn and winter of 1942–43. It was the time of Operation Blue and Operation Fischreiher, the continuation into a second year of Nazi Germany's invasion of the Soviet Union that had started with Operation Barbarossa; it was the time of the Battle of Stalingrad. But, just as much as it takes place as a part of the Second World War, it takes place as part of the history of Stalinist Russia.

The book begins when Axis forces lay siege to the city. Throughout the book there are references to the decaying city and the damage from aerial bombardments and artillery based around the city. There are also occasions in the novel in which the Axis blockade is quite noticeable. The characters suffer from starvation and thirst. The book ends with the surrender of German field-marshal Friedrich Paulus' 6th Army remnants and the return of civilians to the city.

The novel's characters are a combination of fictional and historical figures. The historical figures include Joseph Stalin and Adolf Hitler. Many of the characters are more loosely based on a historical figure, or a representative Soviet citizen. The main character, Viktor Shtrum, is a “self portrait” of Grossman himself, though Shtrum also had a real-life prototype - the Soviet nuclear physicist Lev Yakovlevich Shtrum (1890–1936), who was a family friend of Grossmans in Kyiv. One of the most promising Soviet physicists of his time, Lev Shtrum was arrested and executed during Stalin's Great Purge. Vasily Grossman took an enormous risk and immortalized his friend, first in the novel "Stalingrad", which was first published under the title "For a Just Cause" in 1952, i.e. still in Stalin's lifetime, and then - in the novel "Life and Fate".

In Life and Fate there are different times when the Nazi concentration camps are mentioned. A long section of Life and Fate is about a German prison camp, where many characters are on their way to the gas chamber to be gassed; then follows a dialogue of ranked Nazi officers inside a new gas chamber who toast its opening. The characters shipped off to Germany had been caught leaving one of the countries under Nazi rule. Grossman's inclusion is historically accurate, since there are records of many Russians in Nazi labor and death camps. Grossman also includes another German concentration camp where one of his main arguments takes place concerning communism and fascism. Grossman devotes large sections of the book to the prisoners held at Soviet and German labor and concentration camps, which is necessary for a holistic understanding of the time and events.

== History of the manuscript ==
Begun by Grossman while Stalin was still alive, Life and Fate was his sequel to For a Just Cause. It was written in the 1950s and submitted for possible publication to Znamya magazine around October 1960. Very quickly after it was submitted, the KGB raided his apartment; the manuscripts, carbon copies and notebooks, as well as the typists' copies and even the typewriter ribbons were seized. The KGB did not know that he had left two copies of the manuscript with friends, one with the prominent poet Semyon Lipkin, a friend, and the other (Grossman's original manuscript) with Lyolya Klestova, often erroneously identified as Lyolya Dominikina, a friend from his university days.

On 23 July 1962, the Politburo ideology chief Mikhail Suslov told the author that, if published, his book could inflict even greater harm to the Soviet Union than Pasternak's Doctor Zhivago, speculating that it could begin a public discussion on the need for the Soviet Union. Suslov has been said to have told Grossman that his novel could not be published for two hundred years; however more recent research amongst the documents of both Grossman and Suslov, in writing about this meeting, provide no evidence for this; they doubt that Suslov actually said this. Suslov's comment reveals both the presumption of the censor and recognition of the work's lasting significance. Grossman tried to appeal against this verdict to Khrushchev personally, unaware of Khrushchev's personal antagonism towards Grossman, and misunderstanding the climate of the time.

"I ask you to return freedom for my book, I ask that my book be discussed with editors, not the agents of the KGB. What is the point of me being physically free when the book I dedicated my life to is arrested ... I am not renouncing it ... I am requesting freedom for my book."

In 1974, Lipkin got one of the surviving copies to put onto microfilm and smuggled it out of the country with the help of satirical writer Vladimir Voinovich and nuclear scientist Andrei Sakharov. Grossman died in 1964, never having seen his book published, which did not happen in the West until 1980 at the publishing house L'Age d'homme, thanks to the efforts of Shimon Markish, professor of the University of Geneva and Efim Etkind (then in Paris) who achieved the meticulous work of reading from the microfilm.

As the policy of glasnost was initiated by Mikhail Gorbachev, the novel was finally published on Russian soil in 1988 in the Oktyabr magazine and as a book.

Some critics have compared Grossman's war novels, and specifically Life and Fate, with Leo Tolstoy's monumental work War and Peace. He had written to his daughter that War and Peace had been the only book he had been able to read during Stalingrad, but while there are similarities, it is recognized that, because Grossman actually witnessed the events of Stalingrad, there are many differences. Robert Chandler, who translated Life and Fate into English, while noting the comparison with Tolstoy, says that there is something Chekhovian about his writing.

In Linda Grant's introduction to the 2011 Random House edition of the book, Grant says that Grossman never had the chance to edit his book; what Robert Chandler had to work with was a work that was "a copy from an imperfect microfilm of an imperfect book".

== Radio adaptation ==
An English-language radio adaptation of the novel was broadcast on BBC Radio 4 from 18 to 25 September 2011. Translated by Robert Chandler and dramatised by Jonathan Myerson and Mike Walker, the eight-hour dramatisation stars Kenneth Branagh, David Tennant, Janet Suzman, Greta Scacchi and Harriet Walter.

== Television adaptation ==
A television series, with twelve episodes, based on the book was broadcast on Russian television in 2012. It is also available on Amazon Prime in certain countries.

== See also ==
- Lieutenant prose
- The Cursed and Killed
- The Living and the Dead (trilogy)
