= David Markish =

Israeli writer

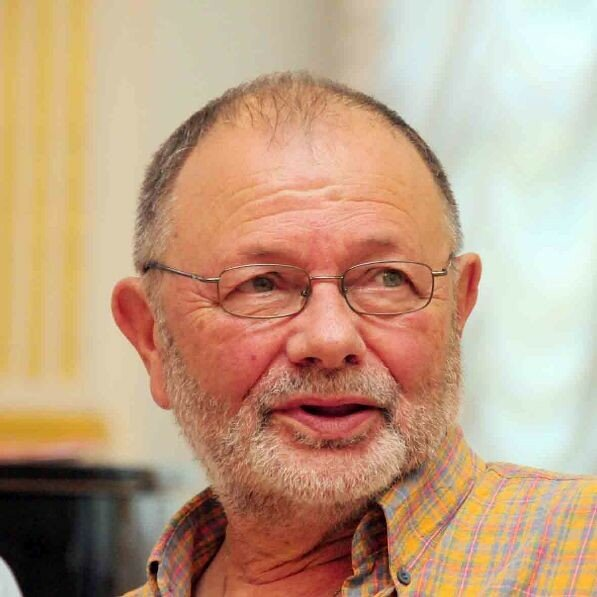
- David Peretzovich Markish
- Born: 24 September 1938 (age 87); Moscow, USSR

David Markish (Russian: Давид Маркиш, Hebrew: דוד מרקיש), is an Israeli prose writer, poet and translator who writes predominantly in Russian.

== Life ==
David Markish was born in 1938 in Moscow, the Soviet Union to the famous Jewish poet Peretz Markish (1895-1952), murdered in the case of the Jewish Anti-Fascist Committee, mother – writer Esther Efimovna Lazebnikova-Markish (1912-2010), older brother – Shimon Markish (Russian: Симон Перецович Маркиш) (1931-2003) – professor at the University of Geneva, half-sister ceramic sculptor (English: Olga Rapay-Markish) (1929-2012).

In January 1953, the Peretz Markish family was arrested and exiled to Kazakhstan Kzyl-Orda. In 1954, he returned to Moscow with his family. He studied at the Literary Institute named after Maksim Gorky (1957-1962) and at the Higher Courses of scriptwriters and film directors in Moscow (1967-1968). In 1972 he repatriated to Israel and participated in the Yom Kippur War (1973). He lives in Or Yehuda.

Twelve of David's novels were published in Russian, most were translated into other languages and published in the USA, United Kingdom, Germany, France, Switzerland, Sweden, and Brazil. He has been awarded many international literary prizes, including the Ukrainian Literary Prize, the British Book League Prize and the Ivan Machabeli Georgian Literary Prize. David was a Chairman of the Union of Russian-Speaking Writers of Israel (1982–85) and the President of the Israel Association of Creative Intelligentsia (since 2000).

== Selected works ==
- Five close to the sky, Leningrad, Hydrometeoizdat, 1966
- Trilogy “A New World for Simon Ashkenazy"):
1. Story Embellishment. Tel Aviv, 1978 (a novel about Kazakhstan exile)
2. Pure field, 1978
3. Life on the doorstep, 1978
- Here and there (in Hebrew), Tel Aviv, 1978
- The cock, 1980 (a novel about a Soviet poet)
- Forward, 1980
- Jesters, Tel Aviv, 1983 (a historical novel about Jews in the court of Peter the Great), published in Russian, 1986, in English, 1988, by Henry Holt & Company
- In the Shadow of a Big Stone, published in Hebrew, 1982 and Russian, 1986
- Sugar kennel, 1984
- The Dog, Tel Aviv, 1984 (a novel about a Russian immigrant in the West)
- After me, Tel Aviv, 1984
- The Donor, Tel Aviv, 1987
- Polyushko Pole, New York, 1988 (a novel about the Civil War)
- The Field, 1889
- The Garnet Shaft, Tel Aviv, 1990
- My Enemy Cat, 1991
- To Be Like Others, novel, published by The Banner, 2000
- The Jew of Peter the Great, or the Chronicle from the life of passers-by, Novel. – St. Petersburg: "Limbus Press", 2001.
- To Become Lyutov, St. Petersburg, Limbus-press, 2001 (a novel about Isaac Babel)
- White circle, novel, Moscow, Isografus, 2004
- White circle, novel, Orenburg: Publishing house "Orenburg book", 2013, Ill. S. Kalmykova.
- Tubplier, novel, Moscow, Text, 2012
- White heat, Orenburg Book Publishing House named after G.P. Donkovtseva, 2019.
- MAHATMA. The Savior Mankind Never Knew (Translated by Marian Schwartz), a biographical novel about great scientist Waldemar Haffkine, Mahatma Haffkine Foundation, Aleksandr Duel, New-York, 2019

== Awards ==
- Seven Israeli literary prizes
- British Book League Award
- International Literary Prize of Ukraine
- Ivan Machabeli Prize | Georgian Literary Prize named after Ivan Machabeli
