= Efim Etkind =

Russian linguist (1918–1999)

Efim Grigoryevich Etkind
- Ефим Григорьевич Эткинд
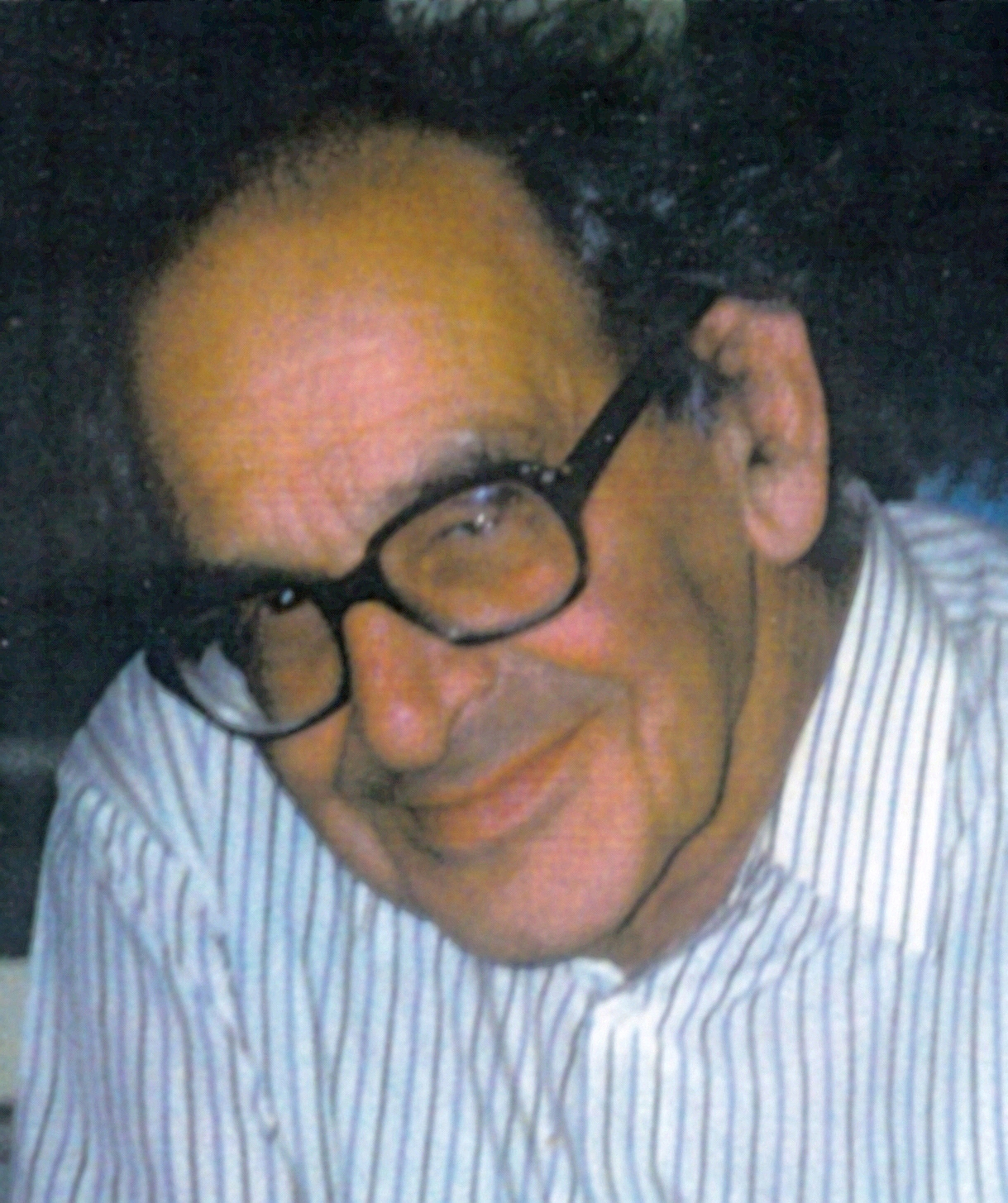
- Efim Etkind
- Born: 26 February 1918; Petrograd, Russian SFSR
- Died: 22 November 1999 (aged 81); Potsdam, Germany
- Citizenship: RSFSR (1918–1922); Soviet Union (1922–1974); France (1974–1999)
- Education: Saint Petersburg State University
- Occupation: linguist
- Movement: dissident movement in the Soviet Union
- Spouse(s): Yekaterina Fyodorovna Zvorykina, Elke Liebs
- Awards: membership of Bavarian Academy of Sciences and Humanities, Akademie der Wissenschaften und der Literatur, Deutsche Akademie für Sprache und Dichtung

Efim Etkind (Russian: Ефи́м Григо́рьевич Э́ткинд, 26 February 1918, Petrograd – 22 November 1999, Potsdam) was a Soviet philologist and translation theorist. In the 1960s and 1970s he was a dissident; from 1974 he lived in France.

== Works ==
Books

- Семинарий по французской стилистике. Ч. 1: проза, ч. 2: поэзия [The seminar on French stylistics. Part 1: prose, part 2: poetry] (in Russian). Moscow, Leningrad: The Leningrad branch of the State Educational-Pedagogical Publishing Company of the RSFSR Ministry of Education. 1960–1961.
- Поэзия и перевод [Poetry and translation] (in Russian). Leningrad: Sovetsky Pisatel. 1963.
- Об искусстве быть читателем [On the art of being a reader] (in Russian). Leningrad: Znanie. 1964.
- Мастера русского стихотворного перевода: в 2 томах [Masters of Russian verse translation: in 2 volumes] (in Russian). Leningrad: Sovetsky Pisatel. 1968.
- Разговор о стихах [Conversation about poetry] (in Russian). Moscow: Detskaya Literatura. 1970.
- Бертольт Брехт [Bertolt Brecht] (in Russian). Leningrad: Prosveshcheniye. 1971.
- Русские поэты-переводчики от Тредиаковского до Пушкина [Russian poets-translators from Trediakovsky to Pushkin] (in Russian). Leningrad: Nauka. 1973.
- Plyushch, Leonid; Mikhaylov, Mikhaylo; Belotserkovsky, Vadim; Elberfeld, Yan; Andreev, Herman; Vishnevskaya, Yuliya; Yanov, Alexander; Levitin-Krasnov, Anatoly; Etkind, Efim; Kushev, Yevgeny (1976). СССР. Демократические альтернативы: сборник статей и документов [USSR. Democratic alternatives: a collection of articles and documents] (in Russian). Achberg. ISBN 978-3881030700. OCLC 3953394.
- Pljušč, Leonid; Michajlov, Michailo; Belocerkovskij, Vadim; Andreev, German; Elberfeld, Jan; Janov, Aleksandr; Levitin-Krasnov, Anatolij; Etkind, Jefim; Kušev, Jevgenij (1977). UdSSR. Alternativen der demokratischen Opposition. Sammelband [USSR. Alternatives of democratic opposition. Collection] (in German). Achberg. ISBN 978-3881030854.
- Форма как содержание: Избранные статьи [Form as content: selected articles] (in Russian). Würzburg: Jal-Verlag. 1977.
- Записки незаговорщика [Notes of a non-conspirator] (in Russian). London: Overseas Publications Interchange Ltd. 1977.
- Notes of a non-conspirator. London: Oxford University Press. 1978. ISBN 978-0192117397.
- La matière du vers [Matter of verse] (in French). Paris: Institut d'Études Slaves. 1978.
- Pliouchtch, Léonide; Biélotserkovsky, Vadim; Mikhaïlov, Mikhaïlo; Andreev, Herman; Lévitine-Krasnov, Anatoli; Yanov, Alexandre; Elberfeld, Yan; Etkind, Yéfime; Vichnevskaia, Youlia; Kouchev, Evguéni (1978). U.R.S.S.: alternatives démocratiques [U.S.S.R.: democratic alternatives] (in French). Paris: Savelli. ISBN 978-2859300258.
- Unblutige Hinrichtung. Warum ich die Sowjetunion verlassen musste [Bloodless execution. Why I had to leave the Soviet Union] (in German) (2 ed.). München: Piper Verlag GmbH. 1982 [1978]. ISBN 978-3492023399.
- Кризис одного искусства. Опыт поэтики поэтического перевода [The crisis of art. Experience of the poetics of poetic translation] (in Russian). Lausanna. 1983.
- Russische Lyrik von der Oktoberrevolution bis zu Gegenwart. Versuch einer Darstellung [Russian poetry from the October Revolution to the present. An attempt at representation] (in German) (2 ed.). München: C.H. Beck Verlag. 1989 [1984]. ISBN 978-3406092831.
- Процесс Иосифа Бродского [The trial of Joseph Brodsky] (in Russian). London: Overseas Publications Interchange Ltd. 1988. ISBN 978-1870128704.
- Brodski ou le Procès d'un poète [Brodsky or the trial of a poet] (in French). Librairie Générale Française. 1988. ISBN 978-2253046509.
- Симметрические композиции у Пушкина [Symmetric compositions in Pushkin] (in Russian). Paris: Institut d'Études Slaves. 1988. ISBN 978-2720402388.
- Стихи и люди: рассказы о стихотворениях [Poems and people: conversations about poems] (in Russian). Leningrad: Ermitazh. 1988.
- Etkind, Efim; Elnitskaya, Svetlana (1995). Гаврила Державин, 1743–1816 [Gavriil Derzhavin, 1743–1816] (PDF) (in Russian). Northfleld, Vermont: The Russian School of Norwich University. OCLC 33075088. Archived (PDF) from the original on 21 April 2016.
- Там, внутри. Русская поэзия XX века [There, inside. Russian poetry of XX century] (in Russian). Saint Petersburg. 1996.
- Внутренний человек и внешняя речь. Очерки психопоэтики русской литературы XVIII–XIX веков [Internal man and external speech. Outlines of psychopoetics of Russian literature of XVIII–XIX centuries] (in Russian). Языки русской культуры. 1998. ISBN 978-5785900486.
- Маленькая свобода: 25 немецких поэтов за пять веков в переводах Ефима Эткинда [Little freedom: 25 German poets for five centuries in translations by Efim Etkind] (in Russian). 1998.
- Божественный Глагол. Пушкин, прочитанный в России и во Франции [Divine Verb. Pushkin, read in Russia and in France] (in Russian). Языки русской культуры. 1999. ISBN 978-5785900905.
- Записки незаговорщика. Барселонская проза [Notes of a non-conspirator. Barcelona prose] (in Russian). Moscow: Akademicheskiy Proyekt. 2001. ISBN 978-5733101828.
- Проза о стихах [Prose about verses] (in Russian). Moscow: Znanie. 2001.
- Психопоэтика [Psychopoetics: "internal man" and external speech: papers and studies] (in Russian). Saint Petersburg: Iskusstvo-SPB. 2005. ISBN 978-5210015839.

Articles

- Etkind, Efim (1967). "La stylistique comparée, base de l'art de traduire" [Comparative stylistics, basic art of translation]. Babel (in French). 13 (1): 23–30. doi:10.1075/babel.13.1.07etk.
- Etkind, Efim (March 1967). "Comparative stylistics: a guide to the art of translation". Diogenes. 15 (57): 33–46. doi:10.1177/039219216701505703. S2CID 144877581.
- Etkind, Efim (April–May 1967). "Baudelaire en langue russe" [Baudelaire in Russian]. Europe (in French). 45 (456–457): 252–261.
- Etkind, Efim (1978). "Стили речи и художественный перевод" [Speech styles and literary translation]. Revue des études slaves (in Russian). 51 (1): 81–83. doi:10.3406/slave.1978.5022.
- Etkind, Efim (1982). Un art en crise: essai de poétique de la traduction poétique [An art in crisis: essay of poetics of poetic translation] (in French). L'Âge d'Homme. ISBN 978-2825121351.
- Etkind, Efim (1982). "Французское средневековье в творчестве Александра Блока" [French Middle Ages in works by Alexander Blok]. Revue des études slaves (in Russian). 54 (4): 649–669. doi:10.3406/slave.1982.5275.
- Etkind, Efim (January–March 1984). "Вьючное животное куλьтуры (об архаическом стиλе Вячесλава Иванова)" [Pack animal of culture (on Vyacheslav Ivanov's archaic style)]. Cahiers du Monde Russe et Soviétique (in Russian). 25 (1): 5–17. doi:10.3406/cmr.1984.1998. JSTOR 20170017.
- Etkind, Efim (April–June 1985). "О поэтическом "импорте" и, в частности, о еврейской интонации в русской поэзии двадцатых годов" [On the poetic "import" and, in particular, the Jewish intonation in Russian poetry of the 1920s]. Cahiers du Monde Russe et Soviétique (in Russian). 26 (2): 193–217. doi:10.3406/cmr.1985.2043. JSTOR 20170067.
- Etkind, Efim (1986). "Le problème de la métatraduction in la traduction" [The problem of metatranslation in translation]. Revue d'Esthétique (in French) (12): 17–22.
- Etkind, Efim (June 1987). "L'Idée de la révolution dans l'œuvre de Pouchkine" [The idea of revolution in works by Pushkin]. Canadian Slavonic Papers (in French). 29 (2–3): 131–151. doi:10.1080/00085006.1987.11091853.
- Etkind, Efim (1987). "Искусство и чернь: о Декларации 1921 года" [Art and black: on the Declaration of 1921]. Revue des études slaves (in Russian). 59 (1): 397–400. doi:10.3406/slave.1987.5643.
- Etkind, Efim (1987). ""Сей ратник, вольностью венчанный…": Гришка Отрепьев, император Наполеон, маршал Ней и другие" ["This warrior, crowned by liberty…": Grishka Otrepyev, Emperor Napoleon, Marshal Ney and others]. Revue des études slaves (in Russian). 59 (1): 55–62. doi:10.3406/slave.1987.5609.
- Etkind, Efim (July–December 1988). "Духовная дилогия Державина: оды "Бог" и "Хеистос"" [Derzhavin's spiritual dilogy: odes "God" and "Kheistos"]. Cahiers du Monde Russe et Soviétique (in Russian). 29 (3/4): 343–356. doi:10.3406/cmr.1988.2153. JSTOR 20170632.
- Etkind, Efim (1992). "Afterword: Russian literature in the 1980s". In Moser, Charles (ed.). The Cambridge history of Russian literature. Cambridge: Cambridge University Press. pp. 595–614. ISBN 978-1-139-05544-4.
- Etkind, Efim (January–June 1994). "Вячеслав Иванов и вопросы поэтики. 1920-e годы" [Vyacheslav Ivanov and issues of poetics. The 1920s]. Cahiers du Monde Russe (in Russian). 35 (1/2): 141–154. doi:10.3406/cmr.1994.2381. JSTOR 20170895.
- Etkind, Efim (October–December 1998). "Библеизмы в русской поэтической речи" [Biblicisms in Russian poetic speech]. Cahiers du Monde Russe (in Russian). 39 (4): 605–620. doi:10.3406/cmr.1998.2544. JSTOR 20171108.
- Etkind, Efim (1999). "Литературное самоубийство Николая Тихонова" [Nikolai Tikhonov's literary suicide]. Revue des études slaves (in Russian). 71 (3): 673–680. doi:10.3406/slave.1999.6624.
- Reeder, Roberta; Etkind, Efim; Gubanov, Yakov (Summer 1999). "The crimes of Joseph Brodsky". New England Review. 20 (3): 95–135. JSTOR 40243738.
- Etkind, Efim (1999). "What is untranslatable?". In Allén, Sture (ed.). Translation of poetry and poetic prose. World Scientific. pp. 337–346. ISBN 978-9814494588.
- Etkind, Efim; Bugaeva, Jane (Spring 2015). "The translator". The Massachusetts Review. 56 (1): 139–147. doi:10.1353/mar.2015.0016. S2CID 201746537.
