= List of foreign Heroes of the Soviet Union =

This is a list non-Soviet citizens awarded the title Hero of the Soviet Union. Of over the 12,000 recipients of the title, 44 of them were foreign citizens.

== Military personnel and partisans ==
- (Bulgaria) Zachari Zachariev
- (Bulgaria) Vladimir Zaimov
- (Czechoslovakia) Josef Buršík
- (Czechoslovakia) Otakar Jaroš
- (Czechoslovakia) Ján Nálepka
- (Czechoslovakia) Antonín Sochor
- (Czechoslovakia) Gustáv Husák
- (Czechoslovakia) Stěpan Vajda
- (Czechoslovakia) Richard Tesařík
- (France) Marcel Albert
- (France) Jacques André
- (France) Roland de La Poype
- (France) Marcel Lefèvre
- Fritz Schmenkel
- (Italy) Primo Gibelli
- (Poland) Władysław Wysocki
- (Poland) Juliusz Hibner
- (Poland) Aniela Krzywoń
- (Spain) Ramón Mercader
- (Spain) Rubén Ruiz Ibárruri

== Cosmonauts ==
- (Afghanistan) Abdul Ahad Mohmand
- (Bulgaria) Georgi Ivanov
- (Bulgaria) Aleksandar Panayotov Aleksandrov
- (Cuba) Arnaldo Tamayo Mendez
- (Czechoslovakia) Vladimír Remek
- (France) Jean-Loup Chrétien
- (East Germany) Sigmund Jähn
- (Hungary) Bertalan Farkas
- (India) Rakesh Sharma
- (Mongolia) Jügderdemidiin Gürragchaa
- (Poland) Mirosław Hermaszewski
- (Romania) Dumitru Prunariu
- (Syria) Muhammed Faris
- (Vietnam) Phạm Tuân

== Politicians ==
- (Algeria) Ahmed Ben Bella
- (Bulgaria) Todor Zhivkov
- (Cuba) Fidel Castro
- (Czechoslovakia) Ludvík Svoboda
- (United Arab Republic) Abdel Hakim Amer
- (United Arab Republic) Gamal Abdel Nasser
- (East Germany) Walter Ulbricht
- (East Germany) Erich Honecker
- (East Germany) Erich Mielke
- (Hungary) János Kádár
