= Oleg Babak =

Ukrainian MVD Lieutenant and posthumous Hero of the Soviet Union

- Russian: Олег Яковлевич Бабак
- Born: 25 February 1967; Viktoria, Pyriatyn Raion, Poltava Oblast, Ukrainian SSR, USSR
- Died: 7 April 1991 (aged 24); Yuxarı Cibikli, Gubadly Rayon, Azerbaijan SSR, USSR
- Alma mater: MVD Higher Political School
- Military career
- Allegiance: Soviet Union
- Branch: MVD
- Service years: 1985 – 1991
- Rank: Lieutenant
- Unit: 21st Operational Brigade
- Conflicts: First Nagorno-Karabakh War †
- Awards: Hero of the Soviet Union

Oleg Babak (Russian: Олег Яковлевич Бабак; 25 February 1967 - 7 April 1991) was a Ukrainian MVD Lieutenant and posthumous Hero of the Soviet Union. He has the distinction of being the last Soviet officer to die in the line of duty that was given the Hero of the Soviet Union award.

Although it was the second last of the 12,775 medals issued it was officially the last proper Soviet-era award before the USSR was dissolved in December 1991. The last medal was awarded on 16 January 1992 to Captain 3rd Rank Leonid Solodkov, but by that time the USSR had not existed as a state for 22 days.

Babak was deputy commander of 11th (currently - Commandant) company for political affairs which was part of the 21st Brigade serving as an operational appointment of the Internal Troops of the Ministry for Internal Affairs of the USSR.

== Biography ==
Babak was born on 25 February 1967 in the village of Victoria now Pyriatyn district of the Poltava Oblast of Ukraine in the family of a worker. From 1974 to 1982 he studied at rural school of the Victoria village, and then at the rural school in Teplovsk. In 1985, he enrolled in the MVD Higher Political School. He became a member of the CPSU in 1988. After graduation in 1989, he served in the 21st Brigade of Special Designation of the Internal Troops of the Ministry for Internal Affairs of the USSR (stationed in Sofrino village in Moscow Oblast) as a deputy company commander for political affairs.

== Death ==
Babak was killed on 7 April 1991, during the First Nagorno-Karabakh War, reportedly while preventing an armed attack at Yuxarı Cibikli village of Gubadli Rayon by militants from Goris and Kapan districts of Armenia. Serving in Yuxarı Cibikli village Oleg Babak fought against nationalists on that day and when the conditions of the surrounding threat became severe he gave an order to retreat to his subordinates, providing covering fire until his ammunition was depleted. At the cost of his own life he saved his comrades.

== Awards ==
By decree of the President of the USSR on 17 September 1991, for courage and heroism in the performance of military duty, lieutenant Babak Oleg Yakovlevich of the Internal Troops of the Ministry for Internal Affairs of the USSR, was awarded the title of the Hero of the Soviet Union (posthumously).

Babak was also awarded the Order of Lenin.

== Memory ==
By the order of the Minister of Internal Affairs of the USSR, Hero of the Soviet Union Oleg Yakovlevich Babak was enrolled in the lists of special designation for personnel of the 21st Sofrinsky Brigade. In October 2010, in a park at the Ashukinskaya platform of the Pushkin District (Moscow Oblast), a monument was opened to Oleg Babak. Additionally, the school of the Victoria village where Oleg Babak studied was named after him.

In the Moscow suburb of Ashukino located near the 21st Sofrinsky brigade of internal troops where Lieutenant Oleg Babak served in the early 90s, a street was officially given the name of the second last Hero of the Soviet Union. The memorial ceremony was held with military honors.
