= Cibikli =

Cibikli or Dzhibikli may refer to:

- Aşağı Cibikli, Azerbaijan
- Yuxarı Cibikli, Azerbaijan
