= General Petrov =

General Petrov may refer to:

- Ivan Yefimovich Petrov (1896–1958), Soviet Army general
- Mikhail Petrovich Petrov (general) (1898–1941), Soviet Army major general
- Racho Petrov (1861–1942), Bulgarian Army general of the infantry
- Vasily Petrov (general) (1922–2003), Soviet Army colonel general
