= Hero of the Soviet Union =

Highest award of the Soviet Union

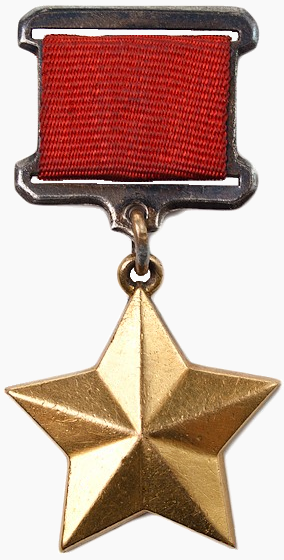
- Gold star medal of the Hero of the Soviet Union
- Type: Highest degree of distinction
- Awarded for: Heroic feats in service to the Soviet state and society
- Presented by: Soviet Union
- Eligibility: Soviet and foreign citizens
- Status: No longer awarded
- Established: 16 April 1934
- First award: 20 April 1934
- Final award: 24 December 1991

Highlights
- Total: 12,777

Precedence
- Next (lower): Hero of Socialist Labour
- Related: Hero of the Russian Federation

The title Hero of the Soviet Union (Russian: Герой Советского Союза, IPA: [ɡʲɪˈroj sɐˈvʲetskəvə sɐˈjuzə]) was the highest distinction in the Soviet Union, awarded together with the Order of Lenin personally or collectively for heroic feats in service to the Soviet state and society. The title was awarded both to civilian and military persons.

== Overview ==
The award was established on 16 April 1934, by the Central Executive Committee of the Soviet Union. The first recipients of the title originally received only the Order of Lenin, the highest Soviet award, along with a certificate (грамота, gramota) describing the heroic deed from the Presidium of the Supreme Soviet of the USSR. Because the Order of Lenin could be awarded for deeds not qualifying for the title of hero, and to distinguish heroes from other Order of Lenin holders, the Gold Star medal was introduced on 1 August 1939. Earlier heroes were retroactively eligible for these items.

A hero could be awarded the title again for a subsequent heroic feat with an additional Gold Star medal and certificate. The practice of awarding additional Orders of Lenin when the title was awarded multiple times was abolished by the Supreme Soviet of the USSR in 1988 during perestroika.

Forty-four foreign citizens were awarded the title.

The title was also awarded posthumously, though often without the actual Gold Star medal presented.

The title could be revoked only by the Presidium of the Supreme Soviet.

Most Soviet-bloc countries followed the Soviet example and instituted their own "Hero" awards. The Soviet-style "Hero" title is still used both in surviving current Communist states such as Cuba and in some non-Communist post-Soviet countries such as Russia, Ukraine, and others.

=== Privileges ===
Individuals who received the award were entitled to special privileges, including:

- A pension with survivor benefits in the event of the death of the title holder.
- Priority on the housing list with 50% rent reduction, tax exempt and an additional 45 square metres (480 sq ft) in living space.
- Annual round-trip first class airline ticket
- Free local public transportation
- Free annual visit to sanatorium or rest home
- Medical benefits
- Entertainment benefits

== History ==
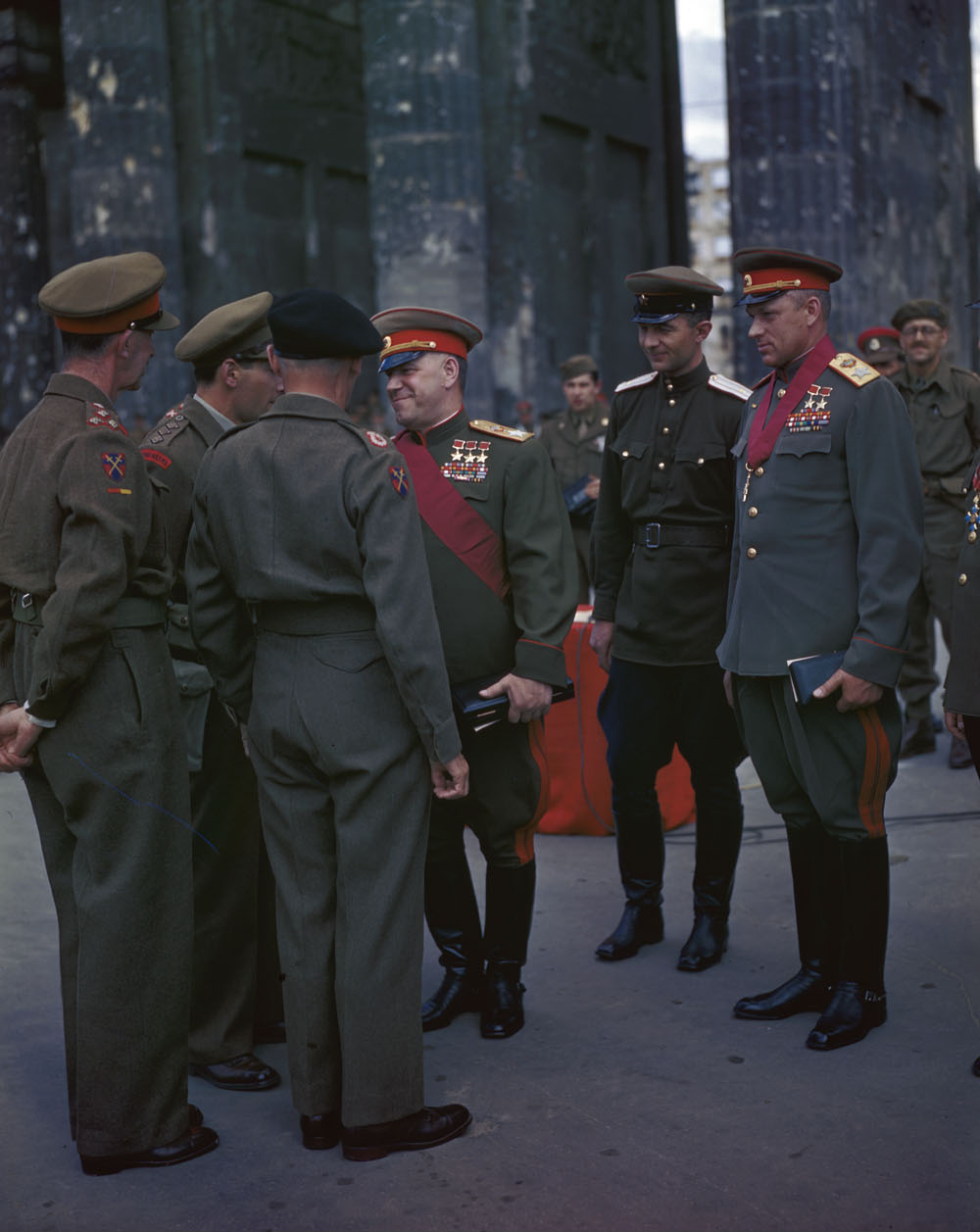
Marshal Georgy Zhukov (center) wearing three Hero of the Soviet Union medals and Marshal Konstantin Rokossovsky (right) wearing two (1945)

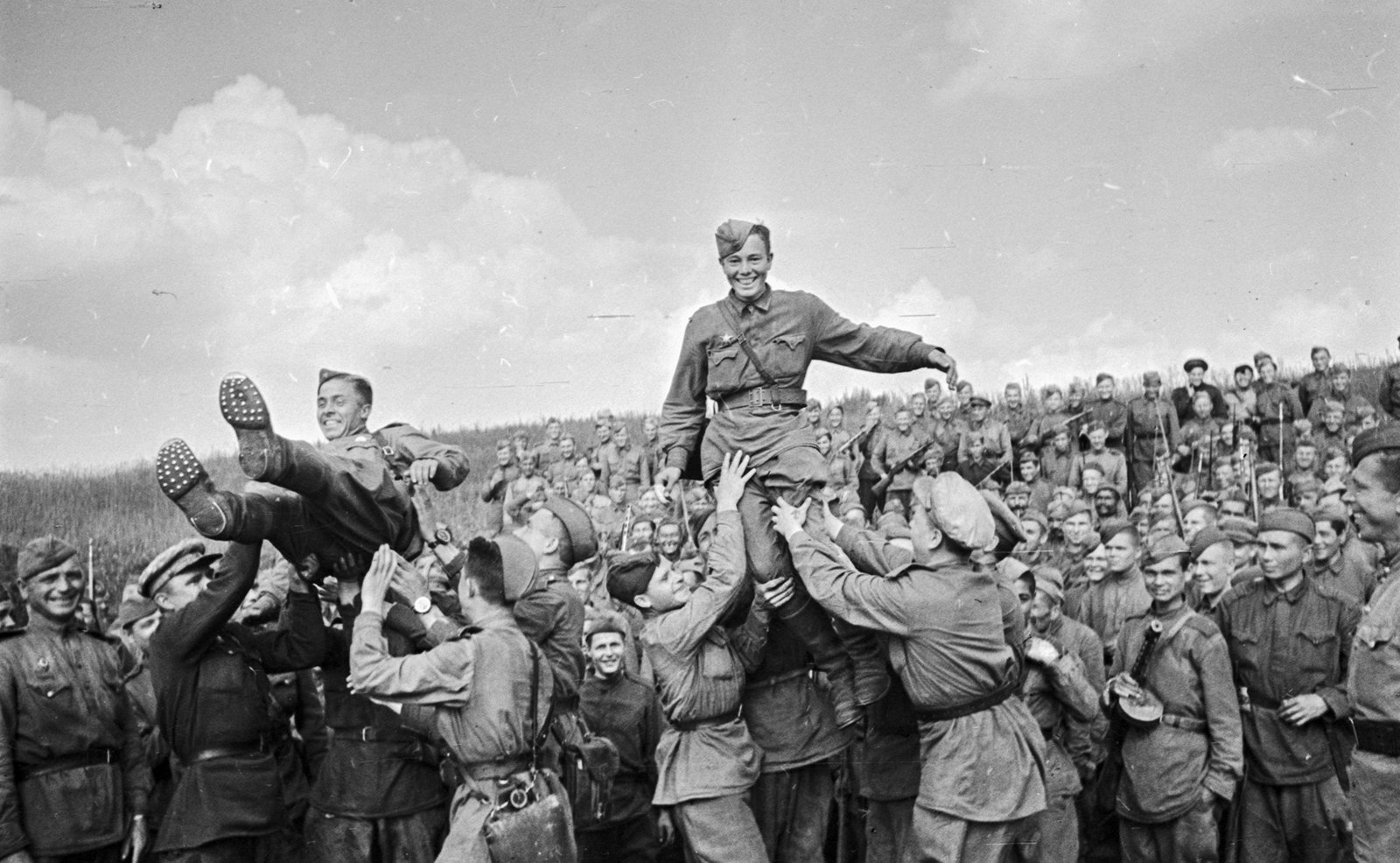
Soldiers of the Red Army's 129th Rifle Division lift their comrades, awarded the title Hero of the Soviet Union, in celebration, 1943.

In total, during the existence of the USSR, the title of Hero of the Soviet Union was awarded to 12,777 people (excluding 72 stripped of the title for defamatory acts and 13 awards annulled as unwarranted), including 154 people who received the award twice (nine posthumously), three who received it three times, and two who received it four times. Among the Heroes of the Soviet Union, 44 people are citizens of foreign states. The great majority of them received it during World War II (11,635 Heroes of the Soviet Union, 101 twice Heroes, three thrice Heroes, and two four-time Heroes). Eighty-five people (28 posthumously) were awarded the title for actions related to the Soviet-Afghan War, which lasted from 1979 until 1989.

The first recipients of the award were the pilots Anatoly Liapidevsky (certificate number one), Sigizmund Levanevsky, Vasily Molokov, Mavriky Slepnyov, Nikolai Kamanin, Ivan Doronin, and Mikhail Vodopianov, who participated in the successful aerial search and rescue of the crew of the steamship Cheliuskin, which sank in Arctic waters, crushed by ice fields, on 13 February 1934. Valery Chkalov, who made the first-ever Trans-polar flight, was awarded the title on 24 July 1936. Valentina Grizodubova, a female pilot, was the first woman to become a Hero of the Soviet Union (2 November 1938) for her international women's record for a straight-line distance flight. Zoya Kosmodemyanskaya, a Soviet partisan, was the first woman to become a Hero of the Soviet Union during World War II (February 16, 1942), posthumously.

According to Soviet war interpreter Elena Rzhevskaya, reports of several dead Hitler lookalikes in the days following his death stemmed from Colonel General Nikolai Berzarin's pledge to nominate the discoverer of Hitler's corpse for the award. (Despite Soviet claims to the contrary, only Hitler's dental remains were ever certainly identified.)

Over 100 people received the award twice. A second Hero title, either Hero of the Soviet Union or Hero of Socialist Labour, entitled the recipient to have a bronze bust of their likeness with a commemorative inscription erected in their hometown.

Fighter pilots Aleksandr Pokryshkin and Ivan Kozhedub were three times Heroes of the Soviet Union. A third award entitled the recipient to have their bronze bust erected on a columnar pedestal in Moscow, near the Palace of the Soviets, but the palace was never completed.

After his release from serving a 20-year sentence in a Mexican prison for the assassination of Leon Trotsky, Ramón Mercader moved to the Soviet Union in 1961 and as Ramon Lopez was awarded the Order of Lenin and the Hero of the Soviet Union medal "for the special deed" by KGB head Alexander Shelepin.

The only individuals to receive the title four times were Marshal Georgy Zhukov and Leonid Brezhnev. The original statute of the Hero of the Soviet Union, however, did not provide for a fourth title; its provisions allowed for a maximum of three awards regardless of later deeds. Both Zhukov and Brezhnev received their fourth titles under controversial circumstances. Namely, Zhukov was awarded a fourth title in direct violation of the statute. He was awarded the fourth time "for his large accomplishments" on the occasion of his 60th birthday on December 1, 1956. There is some speculation that Zhukov's fourth Hero medal was for his participation in the arrest of Lavrentiy Beria in 1953, but this was not entered in the records. Brezhnev's four awards further eroded the prestige of the award because they were all birthday gifts, on the occasions of his 60th, 70th, 72nd and 75th birthdays. Such practices halted in 1988 due to a decision of the Supreme Soviet of the USSR, which formally ended it. By the 1970s, the award had been somewhat devalued. Important political and military persons had been awarded it on the occasions of their birthdays rather than for any immediate heroic activity. All Soviet cosmonauts, starting from Yuri Gagarin, as well as foreign citizens from non-capitalist countries who participated in the Soviet space program as cosmonauts, received a Hero award for each flight, but no more than twice.

Apart from individuals, the title was also awarded to twelve cities (Hero City) as well as the fortress of Brest (Hero-Fortress) for collective heroism during the War.

== Later recipients ==
The last recipient of the title "Hero of the Soviet Union" was a Soviet diver, Captain of the 3rd rank Leonid Mikhailovich Solodkov on 24 December 1991 for his leadership and participation in a series of unprecedented extreme depth diving experiments. Following the collapse of the Soviet Union, this title was succeeded in Russia by the title "Hero of the Russian Federation", in Ukraine by "Hero of Ukraine" and in Belarus by "Hero of Belarus". Azerbaijan's successor order is that of National Hero of Azerbaijan and Armenia's own hero medal is that of National Hero of Armenia, both modeled on the Soviet one.

== Heraldry ==
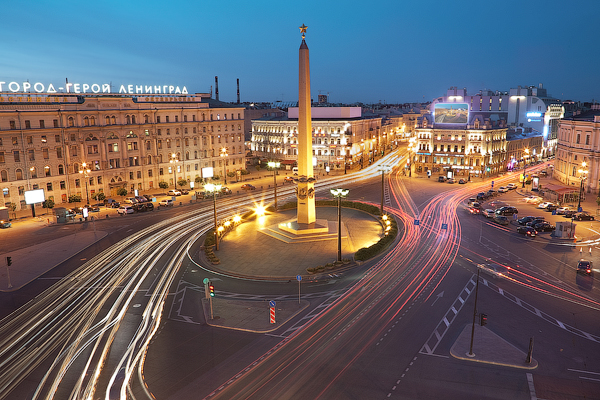
Hero of Soviet Union obelisk of Saint Petersburg.

Coat of arms of the Hero-City of Sevastopol

Coat of arms of the Hero-City of Volgograd

Coat of arms of the Hero-City of Kyiv (1957)

Flag of the Hero-City of Tula

Coat of arms of the Hero-City of Kerch

Coat of arms of the Hero-City of Odesa

== Philately ==
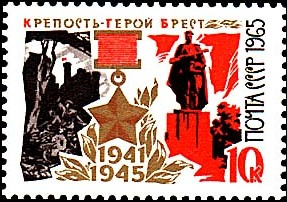
Hero-Fortress of Brest

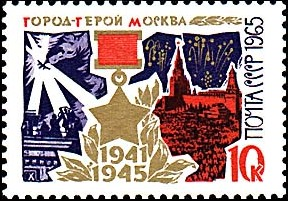
Hero-City of Moscow

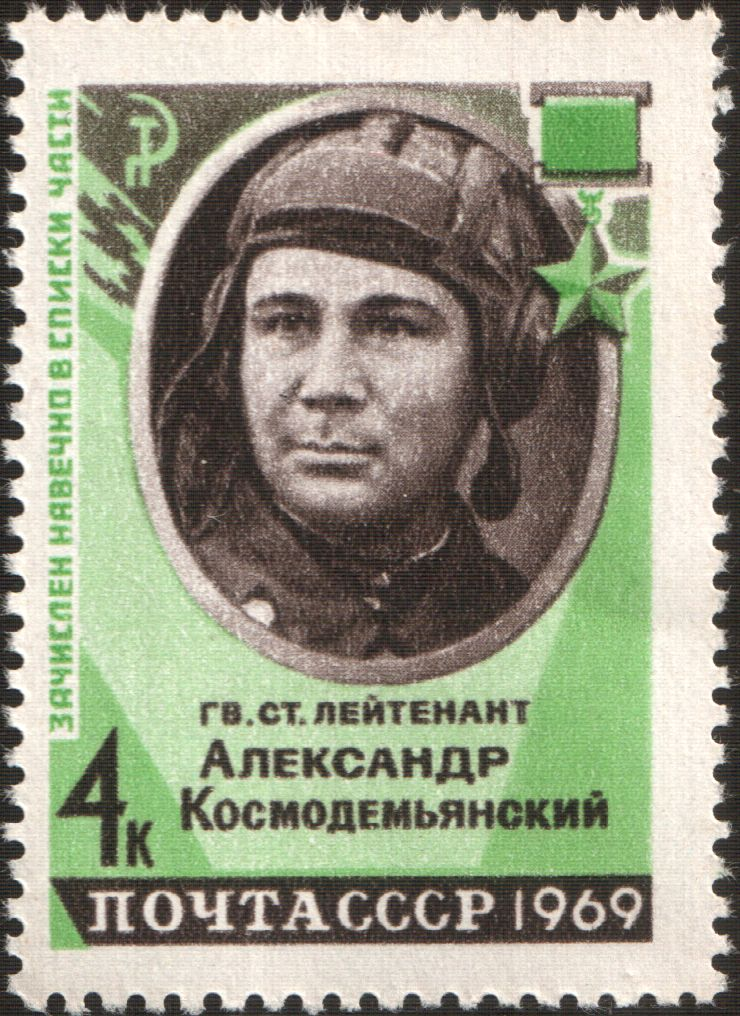
Hero of the Soviet Union Lieutenant Alexander Kosmodem'yanskii

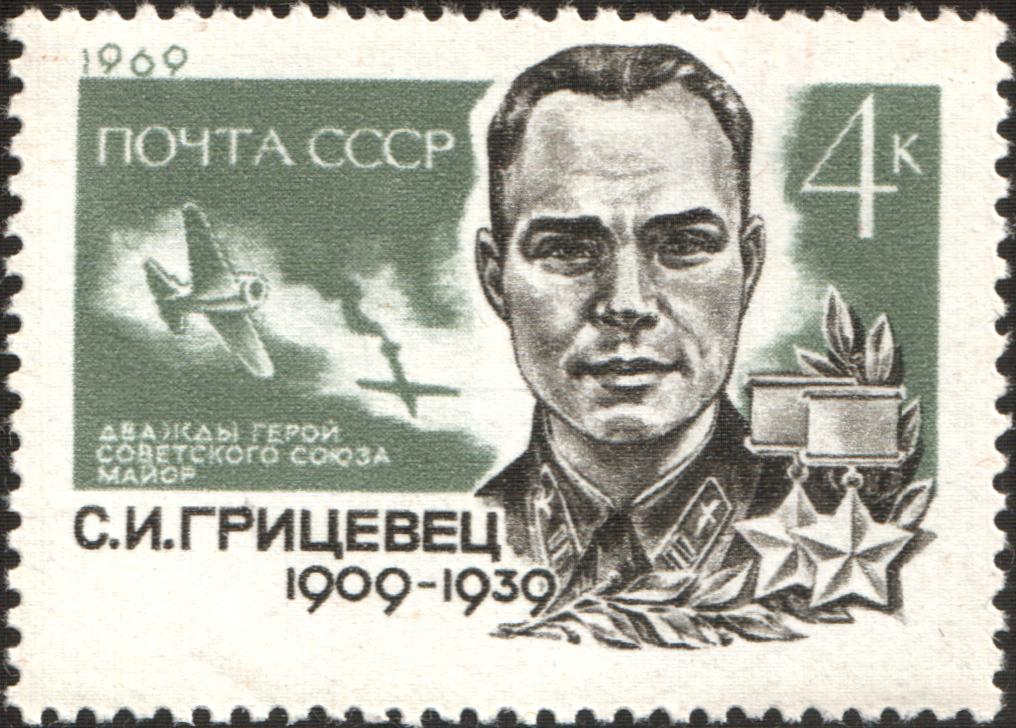
Twice Hero of the Soviet Union Sergey Ivanovich Gritsevets

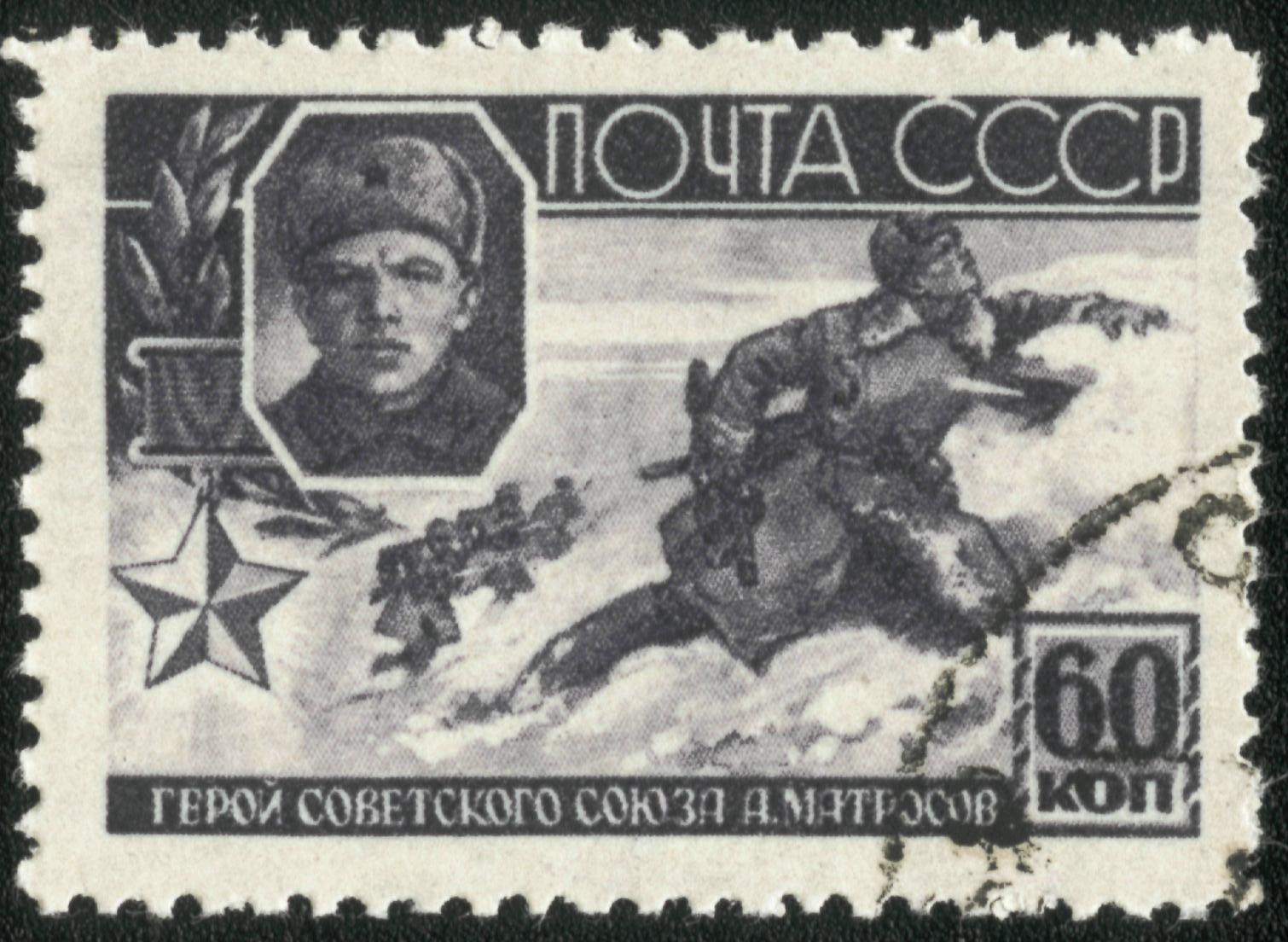
Hero of the Soviet Union Alexander Matrosov

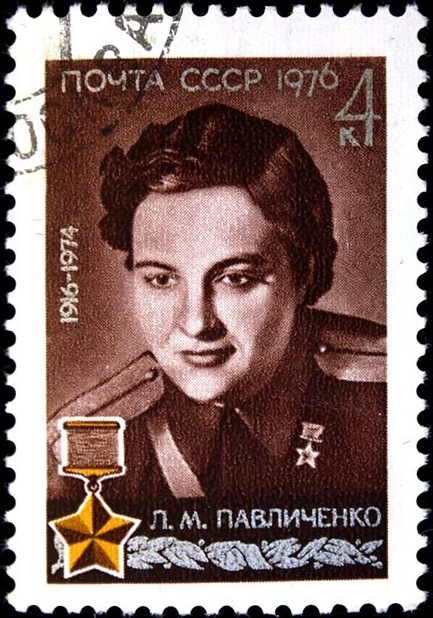
Hero of the Soviet Union Lyudmila Pavlichenko

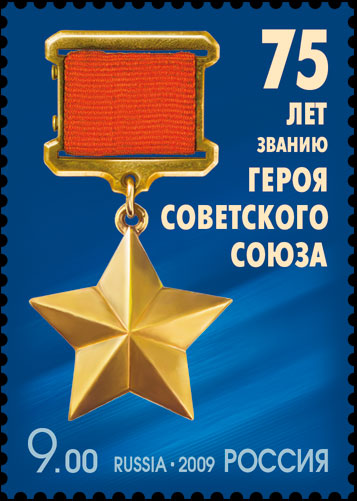
2009 Russian stamp commemorating the Hero of the Soviet Union award.

== Notable recipients ==
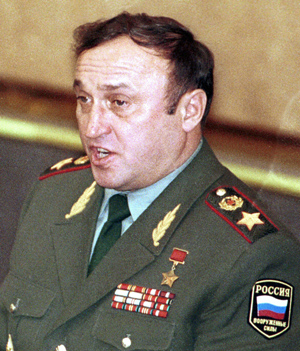
Hero of the Soviet Union Army General Pavel Grachev

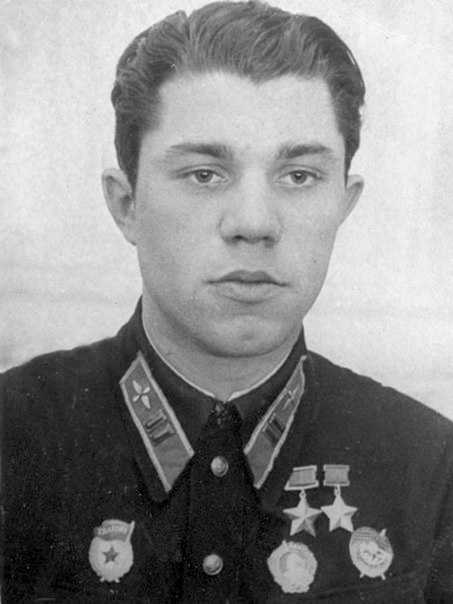
Twice Hero of the Soviet Union Major General Alexander Molodchy

=== Single award ===
- Hamazasp Babadzhanian – future Chief Marshal of the Tank and Armored Troops, for actions near Stanislav
- Oleg Babak – last posthumous recipient to die in the line of duty.
- Mikhail Devyataev – escaped from a forced-labor camp at Peenemünde with crucial intelligence on German rocket programs.
- Andrei Durnovtsev – pilot who dropped the Tsar Bomba
- Yuri Gagarin – first human to fly in space.
- Pavel Grachev – division commander in Afghanistan.
- Ivan Kharchenko – neutralized more than 50,000 explosive items during and after World War II.
- Viktor Kibenok – First responding firefighter to the Chernobyl Disaster. Later died of radiation sickness.
- Valentin Kotyk – Youngest recipient (age 14). Posthumously awarded after being killed in combat during the Great Patriotic War
- Vladimir Konovalov – submarine commander; sank the German ship Goya.
- Zoya Kosmodemyanskaya – the first woman awarded the title during World War II.
- Alexander Krivets – participant in the Soviet partisan movement during World War II, commander of the Shchors partisan detachment.
- Matvey Kuzmin – oldest recipient; led a Nazi division to an ambush in Malkino.
- Nikolai Kuznetsov – intelligence officer responsible for the kidnappings and assassinations of several high-ranking Nazis.
- Lydia Litvyak – World War II fighter pilot and the world's top female ace.
- Alexander Marinesko – the most successful Soviet submarine commander in terms of gross register tonnage (GRT) sunk.
- Alexander Matrosov – posthumously awarded for blocking an enemy machine-gun with his own body.
- Nikolai Melnik – Soviet pilot known for placing radiation sensors at the Chernobyl's Nuclear Power Plant, Reactor 4, during the 1986 explosion.
- Aliya Moldagulova – sniper who led her brigade after suffering high casualties
- Pore Mosulishvili – Soviet Soldier and member of the Italian resistance.
- Ivan Panfilov – Soviet general. Killed in action during the Battle of Moscow. The 8th Guards Rifle Division of the Red Army was named in his honor.
- Lyudmila Pavlichenko – highest scoring female sniper.
- Vasily Pavlov – test pilot and Air Forces colonel.
- Yakov Pavlov – commanded the defenders of the building named after him in Stalingrad.
- Vladimir Pravik – Firefighter that responded to the Chernobyl Disaster, and later died of radiation sickness.
- Nikolay Pukhov – Colonel General in World War II and the first commander of the 8th Tank Army.
- Endel Puusepp – Soviet World War II bomber pilot.
- Otto Schmidt – scientist and explorer of the Arctic.
- Ivan Sidorenko – One of the top snipers of World War II, with over 500 kills.
- Richard Sorge – Soviet spy, reported from Japanese information the exact date that Operation Barbarossa would begin.
- Joseph Stalin – General Secretary of the Communist Party (1922–1953) and Head of Government as Premier of the USSR (1941–1953).
- Leonid Telyatnikov – Head of the fire department at the Chernobyl Nuclear Power Plant
- Valentina Tereshkova – first woman to fly in space.
- Michael Tsiselsky – Soviet naval pilot during World War II.
- Zhambyl Tulaev – Soviet sniper, killed 313 German soldiers.
- Dmitriy Ustinov – Marshal of the Soviet Union and Minister of Defense of the Soviet Union from 1976 until his death in 1984.
- Vasily Zaytsev – sniper who killed 225 at the Battle of Stalingrad; his achievements are dramatized in the film Enemy at the Gates.
- Viktor Zholudev – posthumously awarded for leadership during Operation Bagration
- Dmitry Komar, Vladimir Usov, and Ilya Krichevsky – Posthumously awarded for being killed while attempting to block IFVs from reaching the White House during the August Coup
- Leonid Solodkov – Last recipient of the award before it was succeeded by the Hero of the Russian Federation award
- Natalya Meklin

=== Two times awarded ===
- Ivan Konev – Marshal of the Soviet Union and Commander of the 1st and 2nd Ukrainian Front during World War II.
- Ivan Bagramyan – Marshal of the Soviet Union
- Konstantin Rokossovsky – Marshal of the Soviet Union and Commander of the 1st and 2nd Belorussian Front during World War II.
- Hazi Aslanov – Major General of armored troops during World War II.
- Talgat Bigeldinov – Il-2 pilot during World War II and the only Kazakh who was twice awarded the title.
- Vasily Chuikov – General largely responsible for the victory at Stalingrad and attacking Berlin.
- Oleksiy Fedorov – organized underground resistance in Nazi-occupied Ukraine.
- Dmitry Glinka – flying ace with over 50 shootdowns
- Aleksei Leonov – cosmonaut who made the world's first spacewalk in 1965.
- Vasily Petrov – Major who lost both hands during the second World War.
- Pyotr Klimuk – Cosmonaut, former head of the Yuri Gagarin Cosmonaut Training Center.
- Vladimir Kokkinaki – Famous test pilot and record breaker.
- Vladimir Komarov – Cosmonaut, second award posthumous after his death onboard Soyuz 1.
- Sydir Kovpak – partisan leader in Ukraine.
- Boris Safonov – World War II naval pilot and flying ace
- Nelson Stepanyan – World War II ground-attack pilot.
- Vladimir Solovyov – Cosmonaut, former director of Mir and last man on Salyut 7.
- Amet-khan Sultan – World War II fighter ace and test pilot.
- Semyon Timoshenko – military commander and senior professional officer of the Red Army, Marshal of the Soviet Union and People's Commissar of State for National Defense.
- Aleksandr Vasilevsky – Marshal of the Soviet Union

=== Three times awarded ===
- Semyon Budyonny – Military Commander, 1st Cavalry Army in the Civil War and later of the Army Cavalry Commands, also Marshal of the Soviet Union and from 1937 to 1940, Commanding Officer, Moscow Military District.
- Ivan Kozhedub – highest-scoring Soviet fighter pilot
- Alexander Pokryshkin – World War II fighter pilot

=== Four times awarded ===
- Leonid Brezhnev – First Secretary, later General Secretary, of the CPSU (1964–82), and Chairman of the Presidium of the Supreme Soviet of the USSR (1960–64 and 1977–82), also awarded one Hero of Socialist Labour; this last feat was the subject of numerous Russian jokes. Also Marshal of the Soviet Union.
- Georgy Zhukov – Military commander and politician credited with many of the most significant Soviet victories of World War II, Commander of the First Belorussian Front and Marshal of the Soviet Union.

=== Foreign recipients (all single awards) ===
- (Democratic Republic of Afghanistan) Abdul Ahad Momand – first Afghan cosmonaut
- Ahmed Ben Bella – first president of Algeria
- (Tsardom of Bulgaria (1908–1946)) Zachari Zachariev – International Brigades pilot under pseudonym Turk Halil Ekrem, awarded 30 December 1936
- (People's Republic of Bulgaria) Georgi Ivanov – first Bulgarian cosmonaut
- (People's Republic of Bulgaria) Todor Zhivkov – Socialist president of Bulgaria
- (People's Republic of Bulgaria) Aleksandr Panayotov Aleksandrov – second Bulgarian cosmonaut
- (People's Republic of Bulgaria) Vladimir Zaimov – Soviet spy in Bulgaria, awarded on the 30th anniversary of his death in 1972
- (Cuba) Fidel Castro – leader of the Cuban socialist government
- (Cuba) Arnaldo Tamayo Méndez – first African descendant and Cuban cosmonaut
- Josef Buršík – for heroism during the liberation of Kyiv, awarded on 21 December 1943, after the occupation of Czechoslovakia he gave the award back
- (Czechoslovakia) Otakar Jaroš – for heroism in the Battle of Sokolovo, posthumously awarded on 17 April 1943 as the first foreign soldier
- (Czechoslovakia) Ján Nálepka (Slovak) – awarded in memoriam on 2 May 1945
- (Czechoslovakia) Vladimír Remek – first Czechoslovak in space and first cosmonaut who wasn't a citizen of the Soviet Union or United States
- (Czechoslovakia) Antonín Sochor – for heroism during the liberation of Kyiv, awarded on 21 December 1943
- Ludvík Svoboda – socialist president of Czechoslovakia and army general, commander of the 1st Czechoslovak Army Corps
- Gustáv Husák (Slovak) – socialist president of Czechoslovakia
- (Czechoslovakia) Stěpan Vajda (Rusyn) – for heroism during the liberation of Poland, awarded in memoriam on 10 August 1945
- (Czechoslovakia) Richard Tesařík – for heroism during the liberation of Kyiv, awarded 21 December 1943
- (United Arab Republic) Abdel Hakim Amer – Egyptian military officer, and member of the Free Officers movement
- (United Arab Republic) Gamal Abdel Nasser – One of the two principal leaders of the Egyptian Revolution of 1952, and President of Egypt (1956–1970)
- (France) Jean-Loup Chrétien – first French cosmonaut (later served as a NASA astronaut)
- (France) Marcel Albert – decorated World War II fighter pilot (Normandie-Niemen)
- (France) Jacques André – decorated World War II fighter pilot (Normandie-Niemen)
- (France) Roland de la Poype – decorated World War II fighter pilot (Normandie-Niemen)
- (Provisional Government of the French Republic) Marcel Lefèvre – decorated World War II fighter pilot (Normandie-Niemen)
- (East Germany) Sigmund Jähn – the first German cosmonaut
- (East Germany) Walter Ulbricht – East German leader
- (East Germany) Erich Honecker – East German leader
- (East Germany) Erich Mielke – East German head of the Stasi
- (Nazi Germany) Fritz Schmenkel – German communist who deserted to Soviet troops in November 1941 and became a partisan, killed 22 February 1944, posthumously awarded 1964
- (Hungarian People's Republic) Bertalan Farkas – first Hungarian cosmonaut
- (Hungarian People's Republic) János Kádár – Hungarian politician
- (India) Rakesh Sharma – first Indian cosmonaut
- (Kingdom of Italy) Primo Gibelli – Italian communist and Spanish Republican Air Force aviator, posthumous
- (Mongolian People's Republic) Jügderdemidiin Gürragchaa – first Mongolian cosmonaut
- (Second Polish Republic) Władysław Wysocki – Polish officer from the battle of Lenino
- (Second Polish Republic) Juliusz Hibner – Polish communist and officer from the battle of Lenino
- (Second Polish Republic) Aniela Krzywoń – Polish soldier
- (Second Polish Republic) Mirosław Hermaszewski – first citizen of Poland to travel into space
- (Socialist Republic of Romania) Dumitru Prunariu – first Romanian cosmonaut
- (Second Spanish Republic) Ramón Mercader – assassinated Leon Trotsky in 1940
- (Second Spanish Republic) Rubén Ruiz Ibárruri – son of the Spanish communist leader Dolores Ibárruri Gómez, killed in the Battle of Stalingrad while fighting for the Red Army
- (Ba'athist Syria) Muhammed Faris – first Syrian cosmonaut
- (Vietnam) Phạm Tuân – first Asian and Vietnamese cosmonaut

== See also ==
- List of Heroes of the Soviet Union
- Hero of Socialist Labor
- Hero of the Russian Federation
- Hero of Belarus
- Hero of Ukraine
- Hero of the Republic of Cuba
- Hero of the People's Armed Forces
- Order of Lenin
- Medal of Honor, Presidential Medal of Freedom, Congressional Space Medal of Honor

== Notes ==
=== References ===
- Alander, Jussi-Pekka (2012). Neuvostoliiton kunniamitalit (in Finnish). Tampere: Apali. ISBN 978-952-5877-13-7.
- Chmelnizki, D. (2007). Архитектура Сталина [Stalin's Architecture] (in Russian). Прогресс-Традиция. ISBN 978-5898262716. Note: The 2007 hardcopy Russian edition cites an invalid ISBN. Here, the valid code is referenced to the 2013 reprint
- Zubovich, Katherine (2020). Moscow Monumental: Soviet Skyscrapers and Urban Life in Stalin's Capital. Princeton University Press. ISBN 9780691205298.
