= Obninsk Institute for Nuclear Power Engineering =

University in Obninsk, Russia

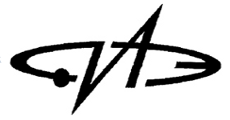
- Обнинский Институт Атомной Энергетики (ИАТЭ)

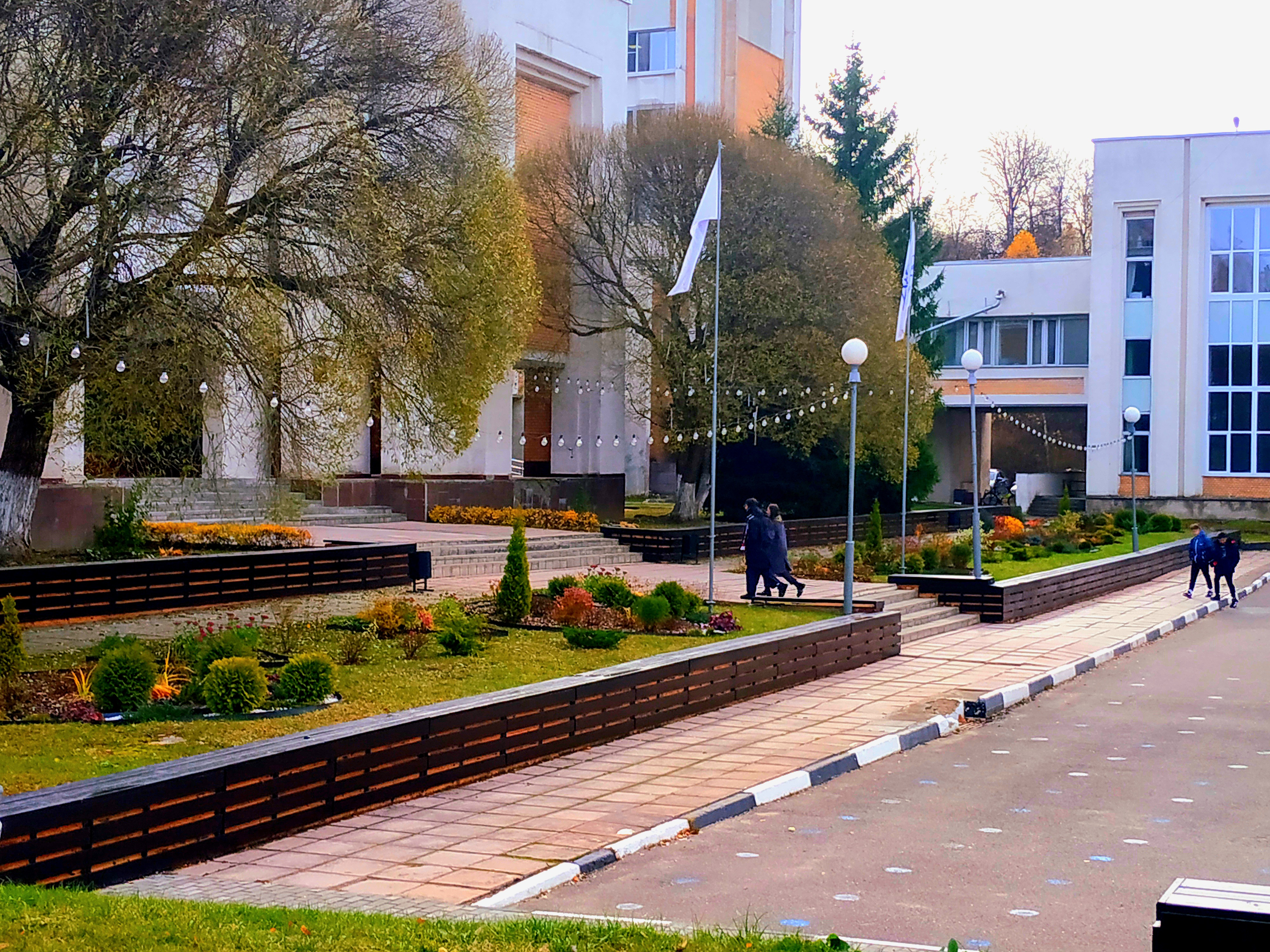
- Type: State university
- Established: 1953
- Director: Alexey Panov
- Academic staff: 343 lecturers, of which 53 are Doctors of Sciences, and 150 Candidates of Sciences
- Students: about 3000
- Location: Obninsk, Russia; 55°8′14″N 36°36′23″E
- Website: http://www.iate.obninsk.ru/

Obninsk Institute for Nuclear Power Engineering (Russian: Обнинский институт атомной энергетики, traditionally abbreviated ИАТЭ) is an institution of higher education located in Obninsk. It began as a branch of the Moscow Engineering and Physics Institute in 1953 to provide specialists in the field of nuclear physics, reactor physics and reactor engineering for the Soviet Union's growing nuclear industry. The education was provided in close cooperation with nuclear-related research institutions in Obninsk.

In 1985 the status was changed for Obninsk Institute for Nuclear Power Engineering to be the leading educational institution to train specialists for rapidly developing nuclear power in the former Soviet Bloc countries. In 2002 it acquired the status of the state technical university. In 2002-2009 it functioned as the Obninsk State Technical University for Nuclear Power Engineering. (Russian: Обнинский государственный технический университет атомной энергетики).

In 2009 the Obninsk State Technical University for Nuclear Power Engineering was incorporated into the MEPhI National Research Nuclear University.

== Structure ==
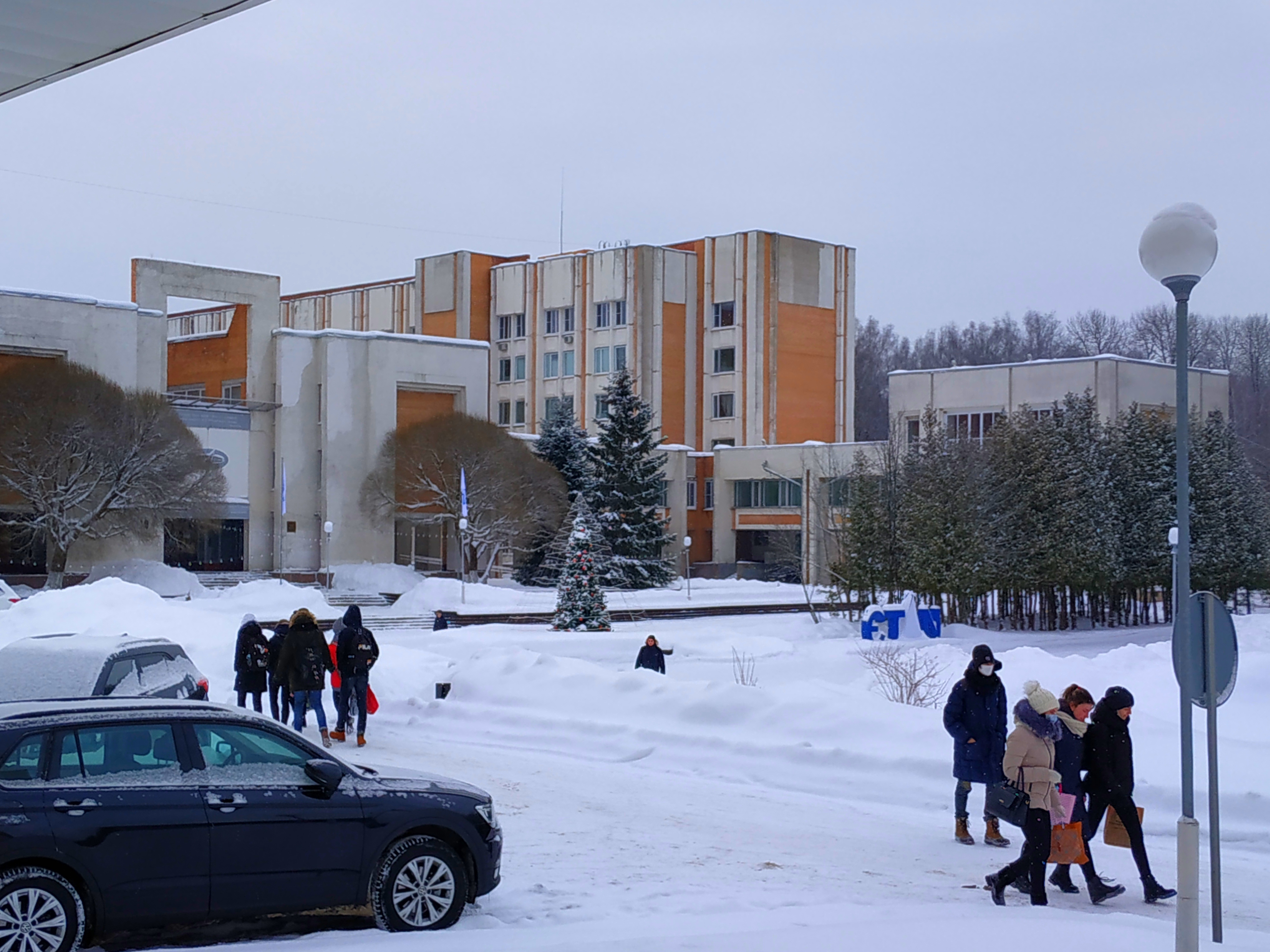
Buildings of the institute in January 2021

Since 2017, recruitment for the main educational programs of higher education at the IATE NRNU MEPhI has been carried out in new structural divisions.

- Division of the Institute of Nuclear Physics and Technology (ОЯФиТ)
- Division of the Institute of Intelligent Cybernetic Systems (ОИКС)
- Division of Engineering Physics Institute of Biomedicine (ИФИБ)
- Division of the Institute of Laser and Plasma Technologies (ЛаПлаз)
- Department of Social and Economic Sciences (ОСЭН)
- Institute of General Professional Training
- Preparatory Faculty
- Technical College

Other:

- Center for Continuing Professional Education

=== Directions of training and specialties ===
- 01.03.02 Applied Mathematics and Informatics. Qualification: Bachelor.
- 03.03.02 Physics. Qualification: Bachelor.
- 09.03.01 Informatics and computer technology. Qualification: Bachelor.
- 09.03.02 Information systems and technologies. Qualification: Bachelor.
- 12.03.01 Instrument making. Qualification: Bachelor.
- 03.14.01 Nuclear power engineering and thermal physics. Qualification: Bachelor.
- 03.14.02 Nuclear physics and technology. Qualification: Bachelor.
- 03.16.01 Technical physics. Qualification: Bachelor.
- 22.03.01 Materials science and technology of materials. Qualification: Bachelor.
- 05.14.01 Nuclear reactors and materials. Qualification: engineer-physicist.
- 05.14.02 Nuclear power plants: design, operation and engineering. Qualification: engineer-physicist.
- 05.14.04 Electronics and automation of physical installations. Qualification: engineer-physicist.
- 04.03.01 Chemistry. Qualification: Bachelor.
- 04.03.02 Chemistry, physics and mechanics of materials. Qualification: Bachelor.
- 06.03.01 Biology. Qualification: Bachelor.
- 31.05.01 Medicine. Qualification: medical doctor.
- 38.03.01 Economics. Qualification: Bachelor.
- 38.03.05 Business Informatics. Qualification: Bachelor.
- 01.04.02 Applied Mathematics Informatics. Qualification: Master.
- 04.04.02 Chemistry, physics and mechanics of materials. Qualification: Master.
- 06.04.01 Biology. Qualification: Master.
- 09.04.01 Informatics and computer technology. Qualification: Master.
- 09.04.02 Information systems and technologies. Qualification: Master.
- 12.04.01 Instrument making. Qualification: Master.
- 04.14.01 Nuclear power engineering and thermal physics. Qualification: Master.
- 04.14.01 Nuclear power engineering and thermal physics. Qualification: Master.
- 04.14.02 Nuclear physics and technology. Qualification: Master.
- 04.22.01 Materials science and technology of materials. Qualification: Master.
- 38.04.02 Management. Qualification: Master.
- 38.04.04 State and municipal administration. Qualification: Master.

== Notable faculty, staff, alumni and students ==
- Victor Kanke
- Svetlana Roudenko
- Leonid Solodkov
- Leonid Toptunov
