= Stoyan Zaimov =

Bulgarian revolutionary (1853–1932)

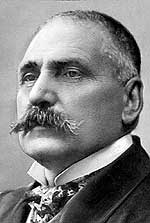
- Born: 12 August 1853; Rupkite, near Chirpan
- Died: 9 September 1932 (aged 79); Pleven

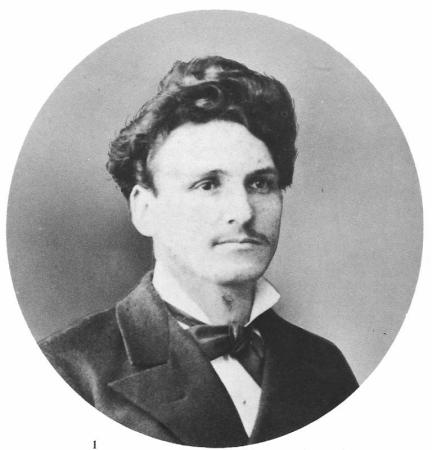
Zaimov in 1881

Stoyan Stoyanov Zaimov (Bulgarian: Стоян Стоянов Заимов; 12 August 1853 – 9 September 1932) was a Bulgarian educator, writer and revolutionary; closely associated with the April Uprising.

== Biography ==
In the late 1860s, while studying at a school in Stara Zagora, he met the future revolutionary martyr, Vasil Levski, and became a member of the Secret Central Bulgarian Committee (TTBK). For the next two years, he attended a teacher's college in Plovdiv, then taught at a boys' school in Haskovo. While there, he participated in founding the local revolutionary committee.

In 1873, he assisted Atanas Uzunov in his attempt to assassinate Hadji Stavri Primo, a local chorbaji who was planning to report them. He was captured and sentenced to exile in Diyarbakır. About a year later, he managed to escape, and made his way to Romania, where he befriended other revolutionary emigrants. In 1875, the Bulgarian Revolutionary Central Committee commissioned him to set fires in Istanbul, to facilitate a planned uprising in Stara Zagora, but the plans were never carried out.

He was a major participant in the Giurgiu Revolutionary Committee, which planned the April Uprising, and was appointed chief of the revolutionary district in Vratsa. After the uprising was suppressed, he was captured and sentenced to death. Following appeals, his sentence was commuted to life in prison. He was kept at the Hospitaller commandery of Saint-Jean-d'Acre, in the Acre Prison, until the Treaty of San Stefano was signed in 1878. It included a general amnesty, so he was released and returned to Bulgaria.

After attending another teacher's college, in Moscow (1882), he devoted his time to teaching; beginning in Shumen, then Kyustendil (1888–1895), and ending in Sofia (1898–1901). During this time, he also headed a committee raising funds to build a home for veterans, and a monument to Tsar Alexander II, which was built from 1903 to 1907, and is known as the "Monument to the Tsar Liberator".

From 1895, he worked with the Ministry of Public Education; compiling textbooks and manuals. In 1896, he founded a magazine, Училищен преглед (School Review), which was published until 1949. He was the Director of the National Library from 1903 to 1908.

He moved to Pleven in 1908, and lived there until his death. For a time, he served as Director of the "Department of Military History Museums and Monuments". His home is now a museum, named after him and his son, Vladimir; a prominent General.

== Sources ==
- Biography of Zaimov @ ОБЩИНА ПЛЕВЕН (Municipality of Pleven website)
- Biography of Zaimov, archived from the website of the Ministry of Foreign Affairs
- Biography of Zaimov @ Литературен свят (Literary World)
