= Saint Petersburg Military Institute of the National Guard Troops =

- Санкт-Петербургский военный институт войск национальной гвардии
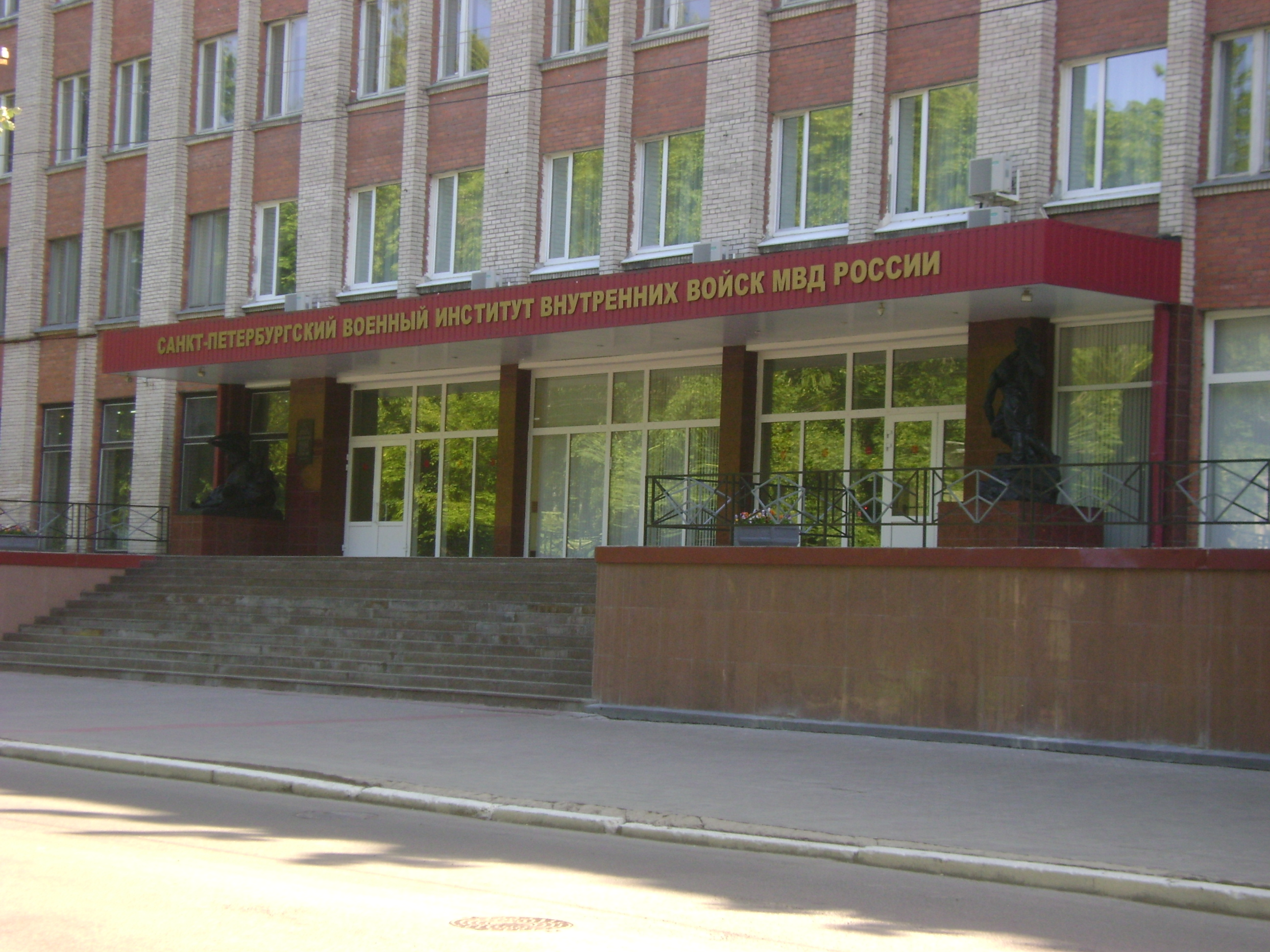
- Type: University
- Established: 1944
- Students: 991
- Location: 1 Lyotchika Pilyutova str., Saint Petersburg, Russia; 59°50′40″N 30°08′23″E
- Campus: Urban
- Website: academy.rosguard.gov.ru

Saint Petersburg Military Institute of the National Guard Troops (Russian: Санкт-Петербургский военный институт войск национальной гвардии) is a military educational institution of higher education that trains mid-tactical officers for units and parts of the National Guard of Russia. Until 1991, the institute was called the Higher Political School of the Ministry of Internal Affairs of the Soviet Union named after the 60th Anniversary of the Komsomol.

== History ==
On October 12, 1944, in the settlement of Upravlenchesky, Krasnoglinsky District, Kuybyshev, Kuybyshev Oblast, the GULAG school for training senior officers for the internal affairs agencies was formed. In memory of this, October 12 was established as an annual holiday at the military institute. At the end of November 1945, the school was transferred to the settlement of Shcherbinka, Podolsk District, Moscow Oblast, and in 1947 it was relocated to the settlement of Novoznamenka, Krasnoselsky District, Leningrad, and received a new name - Znamenskaya Officer School of the Soviet Ministry of Internal Affairs. Until 1951, the school trained and retrained mid-level personnel for the Soviet Ministry of Internal Affairs in various specialties. In August 1951, the school was transformed into the Leningrad Military-Political School of the Soviet Ministry of Internal Affairs. According to its program, political workers for the troops and bodies of the Ministry of Internal Affairs were trained for 2 years. On September 28, 1953, in accordance with the Decree of the Presidium of the Supreme Soviet of the Soviet Union, the school was awarded the Order of the Red Banner. In April 1954, the school was reorganized into the Leningrad Military-Political School of the Soviet Ministry of Internal Affairs, which trained officers and political workers for the troops and internal affairs agencies.

On November 19, 1968, the Council of Ministers of the Soviet Union adopted a resolution that provided for the creation of the Higher Political School of the Soviet Ministry of Internal Affairs in 1969 on the basis of the Leningrad Military-Political School with a training period of 4 years.

A characteristic feature of this new higher educational institution was the organization of scientific research work in it. The development of scientific research work in the field of education of personnel of the troops and internal affairs agencies was put forward as one of the priority tasks. For the successful organization of scientific research work with cadets and students, the school was awarded an honorary diploma of the Ministry of Higher and Secondary Specialized Education and the Central Committee of the Komsomol.

On May 19, 1977, second-year cadet Anatoly Fedorenko, being a guard on duty, killed six and wounded two people in the guard room (the killer was neutralized by one of the mortally wounded cadets and was subsequently sentenced to death).

In November 1978, the school was awarded the honorary title "named after the 60th anniversary of the Komsomol". On February 23, 1978, a branch of the Central Museum of Internal Troops was created in the school, and on May 6, 1990, a history room of the school was opened.

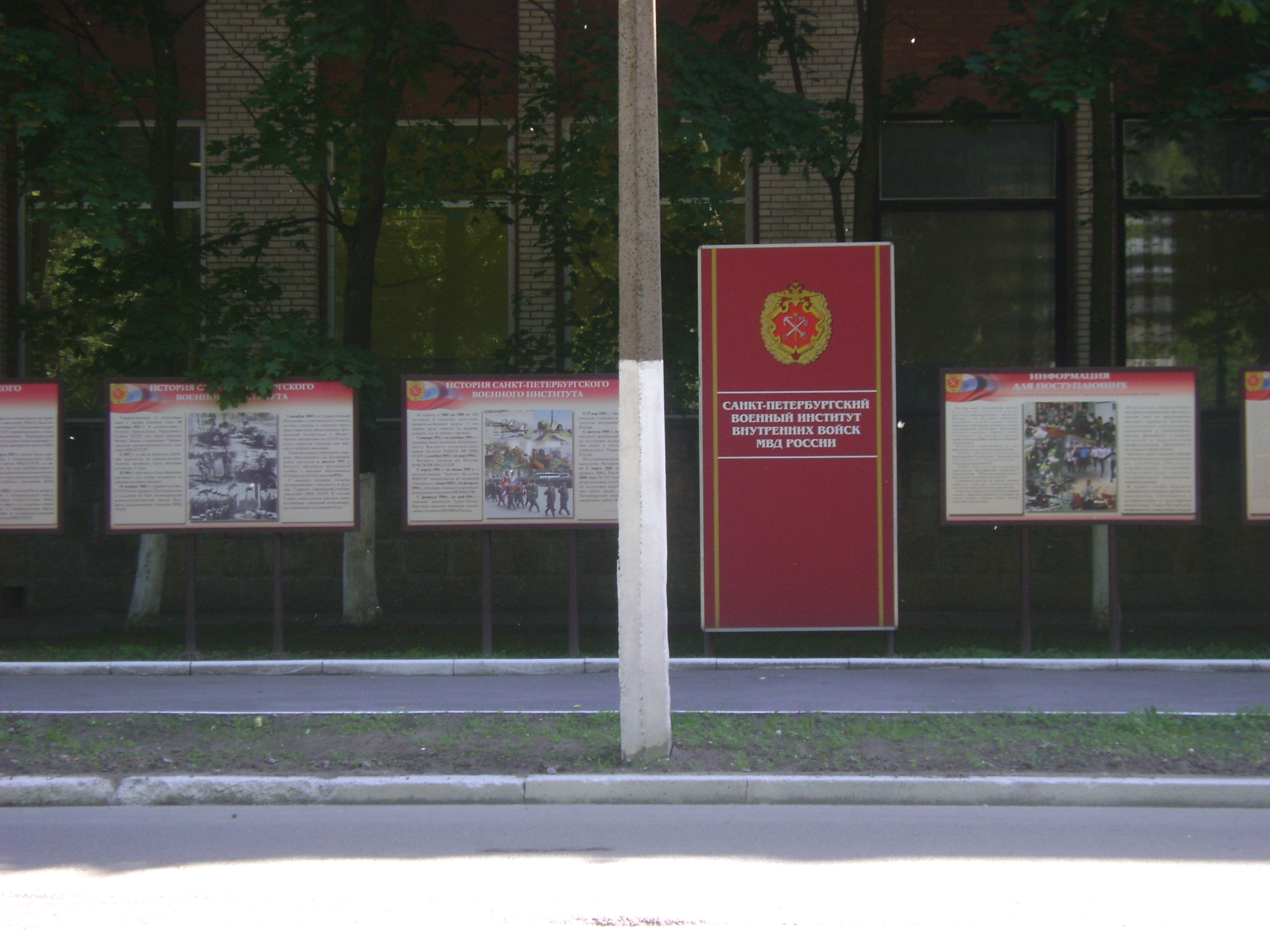
The institute

In 1992, by the Decree of the Government of Russia No. 398 of June 11 and the Order of the Minister of Internal Affairs of the Russian Federation No. 206 of June 25, the school was transformed into the Higher Military Command School of the Internal Troops of the Ministry of Internal Affairs of Russia, as a fundamentally new higher educational institution, and in 1994 it received the name of the St. Petersburg Higher Military Command School of the Internal Troops of the Ministry of Internal Affairs of Russia. In 1996, by the Decree of the Government of Russia of May 17, 1996 No. 598, the school was transformed into the St. Petersburg Military Institute of the Internal Troops of the Ministry of Internal Affairs of Russia. In 1998, by the resolution of the Government of Russia of June 18, 1998 No. 611, the St. Petersburg Military Institute of the Internal Troops of the Ministry of Internal Affairs of Russia was reorganized into the faculty of training personnel for the internal troops of the St. Petersburg University of the Ministry of Internal Affairs of Russia. In 2000, on the basis of the Order of the Government Russia of March 2, 2000 No. 320 and the order of the Minister of Internal Affairs of Russia of March 24, 2000 No. 013, the St. Petersburg Military Institute of Internal Troops of the Ministry of Internal Affairs of Russia was re-established on the basis of the faculty for training personnel for the internal troops of the St. Petersburg University of the Ministry of Internal Affairs of Russia.

The Institute's personnel participated in the performance of combat missions to ensure public order at the Olympic Games in Moscow in 1980, as part of the military operational reserve in Yerevan and Baku in 1988-1989, and at the Goodwill Games in St. Petersburg in 1994. Since December 1994, the Institute's permanent staff has been sent on missions to the North Caucasus. The staff also participated in ensuring security in St. Petersburg during the 2018 FIFA World Cup.

By Decree of the President of Russia of May 13, 2019 No. 215 "for high performance in combat training, courage and dedication demonstrated during the performance of combat training missions, training of qualified specialists" the St. Petersburg Military Institute of the National Guard Troops of the Russian Federation was awarded the Order of Zhukov.

Graduates of the institute who demonstrated courage and heroism in the performance of service and combat missions, Colonel Mikhail Tikhonov, Captain Mikhail Isakov, Lieutenant Oleg Babak were awarded the title of Hero of the Soviet Union, and Lieutenant Colonel Oleg Kublin, Major Sergei Basurmanov, Major Nikita Kulkov, Captain Dmitry Serkov, Captain Aleksandr Yanklovich, Senior Lieutenant Sergei Bogdanchenko, Senior Lieutenant Gennady Kichkaylo, Lieutenant Vitaly Babakov, Lieutenant Sergei Goryachev, Lieutenant Aleksey Palatidi were awarded the title of Hero of the Russian Federation.
