= Slavgorodsky District =

Slavgorodsky District Славгородский район (Russian)
- District
- Location of Slavgorodsky District in Altai Krai
- Coordinates: 53°0′0″N 78°35′0″E
- Country: Russia
- Federal subject: Altai Krai
- Established: 1924
- Abolished: January 1, 2012
- Administrative center: Slavgorod

Area
  - Total: 2,000 km^{2} (770 sq mi)

Population (2010 Census)
  - Total: 10,154
  - Density: 5.1/km^{2} (13/sq mi)
  - Urban: 0%
  - Rural: 100%

Municipal structure
  - Municipally incorporated as: Slavgorodsky Municipal District
  - Municipal divisions: 0 urban settlements, 7 rural settlements

Slavgorodsky District (Russian: Сла́вгородский райо́н) was an administrative and municipal district (raion) of Altai Krai, Russia. The area of the district was 2,000 square kilometers (770 sq mi). Its administrative center was the town of Slavgorod (which was not administratively a part of the district). Population: 10,154 (2010 Census); 12,157 (2002 Census); 26,280 (1989 Soviet census).

== History ==
The district was abolished effective January 1, 2012, with its territory transferred under the jurisdiction of the town of krai significance of Slavgorod.

== Notable residents ==
- Victor Kanke
