= Victor Kanke =

Russian philosopher (born 1944)

Victor A. Kanke
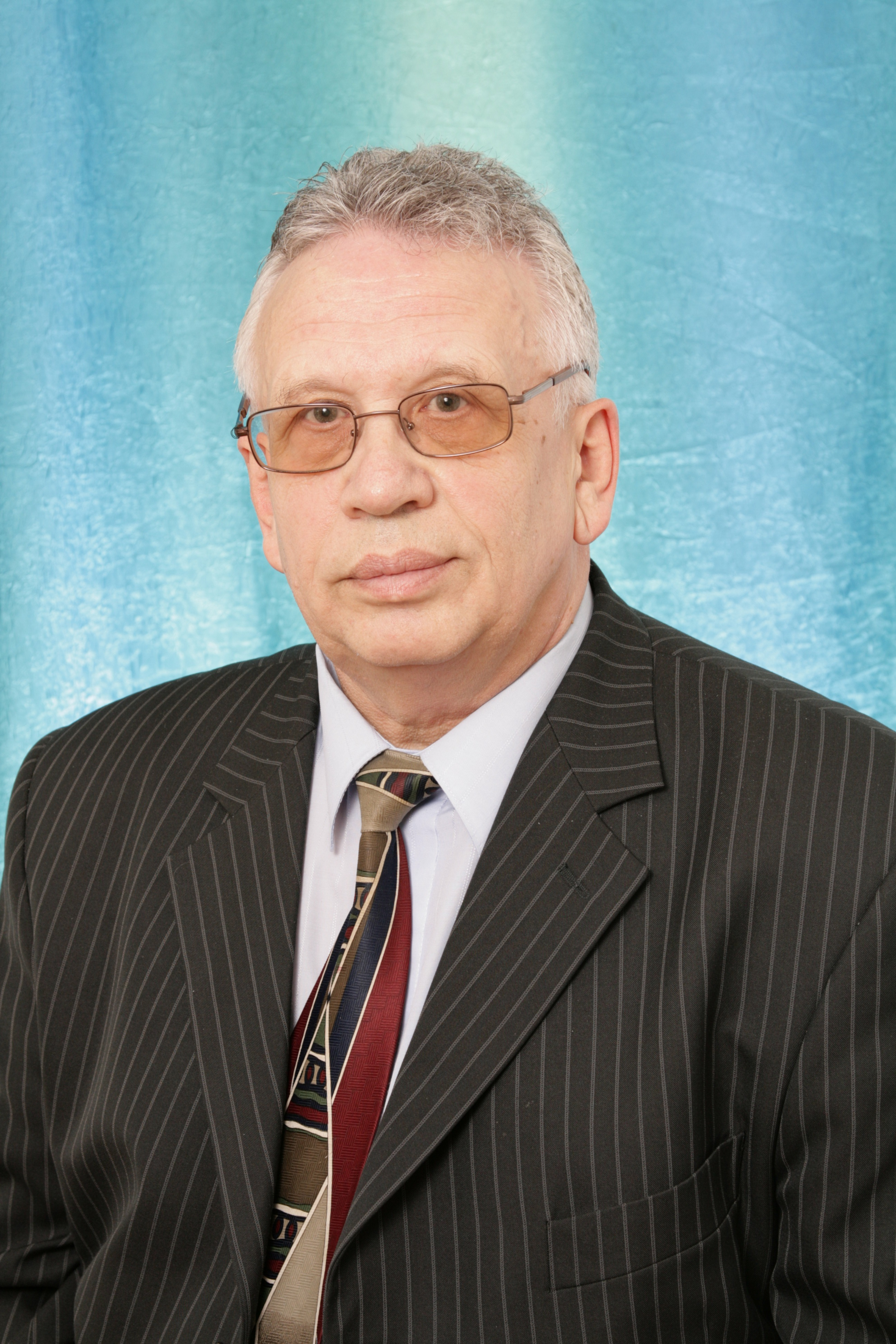
- Born: 29 April 1944 (age 82); Soviet Union

Philosophical work
- Institutions: Obninsk Institute for Nuclear Power Engineering
- Main interests: Philosophy Metascience
- Notable ideas: Metascience, philosophy of science, ethics, phi-losophy of physics, mathematics, chemistry, biology, technology, economics, management, history, pedagogy, law
- Website: www.kanke.ru

Victor Andreyevich Kanke (Russian: Виктор Андре́евич Ка́нке) (29 April 1944) is a Russian philosopher born in the village of Nekrasovo, Slavgorod District, Altai Territory to a German family. He taught physics at school (1966-1974) and philosophy at the Biysk State Teacher Training Institute (1976-1987) and the Obninsk Institute for Nuclear Power Engineering (since 1987).

== Theories ==
In his doctoral dissertation (1985), Kanke developed the concept of time forms, according to which the nature of time is always determined by the specifics of the processes in which it is inherent. Time is a measure of the process from its inception to its new state. It is a common mistake to give physical time universal features. But it is an adequate quantitative measure of solely physical processes.

In 1996–2011, Kanke developed the theory of conceptual transitions. According to this theory, philosophy in its modern form is divided into two parts, namely, substantial and metascientific philosophy. Substantial philosophy, unable to keep pace with science, inevitably takes on a metaphysical form, which is characteristic of post structuralism, critical hermeneutics and analytic philosophy. In its metascientific form, philosophy has to do with subsciences, examining and criticizing their contents. The metascientific approach is opposed to metaphysics in philosophy and substantialism in Science, according to which science does not need to study metascience. The metascientific approach gives priority to the conceptual structure of modern theories that implement some form of transition from one concept to another.

Kanke believes that the metascientific approach is an antidote to SPAM (syndrome of acquired antimetascientificity in sciences) and SPAN (syndrome of acquired antiscientificity in philosophy).

Ethics takes a prominent place in Kanke's theoretical constructions. He believes that modern ethics is built in a substantial manner, so it is dominated by the unscientific syndrome. Genuine ethics is the apex of the philosophy of axiological sciences, it aims at achieving the full potential of the transdisciplinary matrix of modern science, including scientific philosophy.

The theory of scientific transduction involves a comprehensive development of the philosophy of individual scientific disciplines. In this regard, Kanke is known for his monographs in the philosophy of mathematics, physics, chemistry, biology, engineering, computer science, economics, history, management, law, pedagogy.

In accordance with the theory of conceptual transitions, Kanke constructs relevant courses in philosophy. He believes that the general arguments about philosophy and the philosophy of science must necessarily be supplemented by a detailed excursion into the conceptual features of various sciences.

== Selected books ==
- 2008. Philosophy of Science. A Short Encyclopedia. Moscow: Omega-L. ISBN 978-5-370-00180-2.
- 2008 (2000). The Main Philosophical Trends and Conceptions of Science. Moscow: Logos. ISBN 978-5-98704-315-8.
- 2012 (1984). Forms of Time. Moscow: URSS. ISBN 978-5-397-01990-3
- 2008. General Philosophy of Science. Moscow: Omega-L. ISBN 978-5-370-00883-2.
- 2007 (2003). History of Philosophy. Thinkers, Concepts and Discoveries. Moscow: Logos. ISBN 978-5-98704-248-9.
- 2003. Ethics of Responsibility. A Theory of Morality of the Future. Moscow: Logos. ISBN 5-94010-054-6.
- 2007. Modern Ethics. Moscow: Omega-L. ISBN 5-370-00034-4.
- 2011. Modern Philosophy. Moscow: Omega-L. ISBN 978-5-370-01175-7.
- 2007. The Philosophy of Textbooks. Moscow: University Book. ISBN 978-5-9792-0001-9.
- 2006 (2001). Conceptions of Modern Natural Sciences. Moscow: Logos. ISBN 5-98704-071-X.
- 2011. The Philosophy of Mathematics, Physics, Chemistry and Biology. Moscow: Knorus. ISBN 978-5-406-00543-9.
- 2007. The Philosophy of Economics. Moscow: Infra-M. ISBN 5-16-002771-8.
- 2010. The Philosophy of Management. Moscow: Knorus. ISBN 978-5-406-00243-8.
- 2009. The Philosophy of History. Moscow: Publishing House of Moscow State University Press. (Co-authored). ISBN 978-5-8122-1025-0.
- 2011. History and Philosophy of Chemistry. Moscow: Publishing House of National Nuclear Research University “MEPHI”. ISBN 978-5-7262-1433-7.
- 2011. The Philosophy of Pedagogy. Moscow. ISBN 978-5-204-00634-8.
- 2013. The methodology of scientific knowledge. Moscow: Omega-L. ISBN 978-5-370-02887-8.
- 2013. History, philosophy and methodology of engineering and computer science. Moscow: Yurayt. ISBN 978-5-9916-3030-6.
- 2014. History, philosophy and methodology of psychology and pedagogy. Moscow: Yurayt. ISBN 978-5-9916-2990-4.
- 2014. History, philosophy and methodology of natural sciences. Moscow: Yurayt. ISBN 978-5-9916-3041-2.
- 2014. History, philosophy and methodology of social sciences. Moscow: Yurayt. ISBN 978-5-9916-3275-1.
- 2021. Encyclopedia of Metascience and Special Philosophy of Science. Hong Kong/Tallinn: Eurasian Scientific Editions. ISBN 978-988-14066-1-3, ISBN 978-9949-7485-0-1.
- 2022. 50 critical essays on the philosophy of science. Geneva/Hong Kong/Tallinn: Eurasian Scientific Editions. ISBN 978-9949-7485-8-7.
