= Svetlana Roudenko =

Russian-American mathematician

Svetlana A. Roudenko is a Russian-American mathematician known for her work in functional analysis and partial differential equations, and in particular in scattering theory and nonlinear Schrödinger equations. She is also known for her mentorship of women in mathematics, and is a Diversity Mentor Professor and professor of mathematics and statistics at Florida International University.

== Education ==
Roudenko earned a master's degree in mathematics in 1996 from the Obninsk State Technical University for Nuclear Power Engineering in Russia. She completed her Ph.D. in 2002 at Michigan State University. Her dissertation, The Theory of Function Spaces with Matrix Weights, was supervised by Michael Frazier.

== Career ==
After working as an assistant research professor at Duke University, and as a visiting scholar at the Mathematical Sciences Research Institute, Institut Henri Poincaré, and Cergy-Pontoise University, she became an assistant professor at Arizona State University in 2004. She moved to George Washington University in 2010, and to Florida International University as one of two new Diversity Mentor Professors in 2018.

== Research and mentorship ==
As a graduate student at Michigan State University, Roudenko worked in the Emerging Scholars Program there, which worked with freshman calculus students to encourage students in underrepresented groups to go on to advanced study in mathematics.

At George Washington University, Roudenko won a National Science Foundation CAREER Award aimed both at her work on differential equations and their applications in understanding ocean waves, air turbulence, laser focusing, and medical imaging, and also at setting up a math circles for middle school students and summer programs for high school students, with the goal of bringing in more women to mathematics. She also visited the University of California, Berkeley in 2016 and, while there, taught in math circles for elementary-school children. Under her leadership of the George Washington graduate mathematics program, its inclusion of women expanded from one or two women per year to roughly half the program.
