= Władysław Wysocki =

- Born: 24 April 1908; Bielsk Podlaski, Grodno Governorate, Russian Empire
- Died: 12 October 1943 (aged 35); Lenino, Byelorussian SSR, Soviet Union
- Military career
- Allegiance: Poland
- Branch: Polish Army (1928–1939); Polish People's Army (1943)
- Service years: 1928–1943
- Rank: Captain
- Conflicts: World War II; Invasion of Poland; Battle of Lenino †
- Awards: Hero of the Soviet Union; Virtuti Militari

Władysław Wysocki (24 April 1908 – 12 October 1943) was an infantry captain in the Polish People's Army and recipient of the title of Hero of Soviet Union.

== Early life ==
Wysocki was born on 24 April 1908 in Bielsk Podlaski, Grodno Governorate, Russian Empire (now Poland). After graduating from gymnasium in Bielsko, he attended the Army Cadet School.

== Military career ==
On 15 August 1931, President of the Republic of Poland Ignacy Mościcki appointed Wysocki as second lieutenant with seniority, and assigned him into a body of infantry officers in the Polish Army. Marshal of Poland Józef Piłsudski later had him transferred to the 42nd Infantry Regiment in Białystok, and appointed him as a platoon commander on 1 September 1931.

On 22 February 1934, he was promoted to lieutenant with seniority from 1 January 1934. Two years later, he was transferred to the 77th Infantry Regiment in Lida. In 1938, he became the commander of a machine gun company.

=== World War II ===
During the 1939 invasion of Poland, Wysocki fought in the ranks of his regiment at Piotrków Trybunalski. After the fighting ended, he returned to Bielsko. In December 1939, following the Soviet invasion of Poland, he was arrested by the Soviet authorities and placed in an internment camp in USSR.

After signing of the Sikorski–Mayski agreement in 1943, Wysocki enlisted in the Polish Armed Forces in the East. However, he remained in the Soviet Union and joined the Soviet backed Polish People's Army, which was commanded by Zygmunt Berling. He was assigned to the 1st Tadeusz Kościuszko Infantry Division.

In the second half of 1943, the 1st Infantry Division moved to the front line, becoming part of the 33rd Army of Western Front. On 12 October 1943, the unit went through its baptism of fire in the Battle of Lenino.

On 12 October 1943, Wysocki assumed command of the 3rd Battalion of 1st Infantry Regiment after its commander had been killed in action. Wysocki led his unit in successfully capturing German positions, capturing the enemy's first line of defense, and wedging into the second one at the village of Trigubovo (now: Kostyushkovo). He was killed leading his soldiers in a bayonet attack, while defending his unit's position in Trigubovo.

By the decree of the Presidium of the Supreme Soviet of the USSR of 11 November 1943, Wysocki was posthumously awarded the title of Hero of the Soviet Union for the exemplary performance of combat missions on the front in fight against the German invaders, and for the courage and heroism shown at the same time.

== Awards and honors ==
- Poland:
  - Silver Cross of the Virtuti Militari (posthumous)
  - Silver Cross of Merit (19 March 1937)
- Soviet Union:
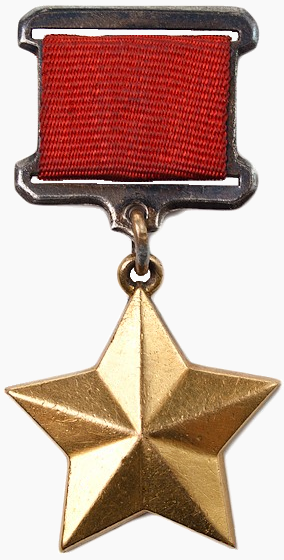
  - Hero of the Soviet Union (11 November 1943, posthumous)
  - Order of Lenin (11 November 1943, posthumous)

=== Other honors ===
On 4 October 1973, Polish Minister of National Defense General Wojciech Jaruzelski, named a mechanized regiment in Wesoła after Wysocki.

A primary school and street in Bielsk Podlaski, are named in honor of him. There is also a bust honoring him in Bielsk Podlaski.
