= Aşağı Cibikli =

- Location within Azerbaijan
- Coordinates: 39°21′17″N 46°27′43″E
- Country: Azerbaijan
- Rayon: Qubadli
- Time zone: UTC+4 (AZT)
  - Summer (DST): UTC+5 (AZT)

Aşağı Cibikli (also, Ashagy Dzhibikli) is a village in the Qubadli Rayon of Azerbaijan.
