= Leonid Solodkov =

Russian naval officer

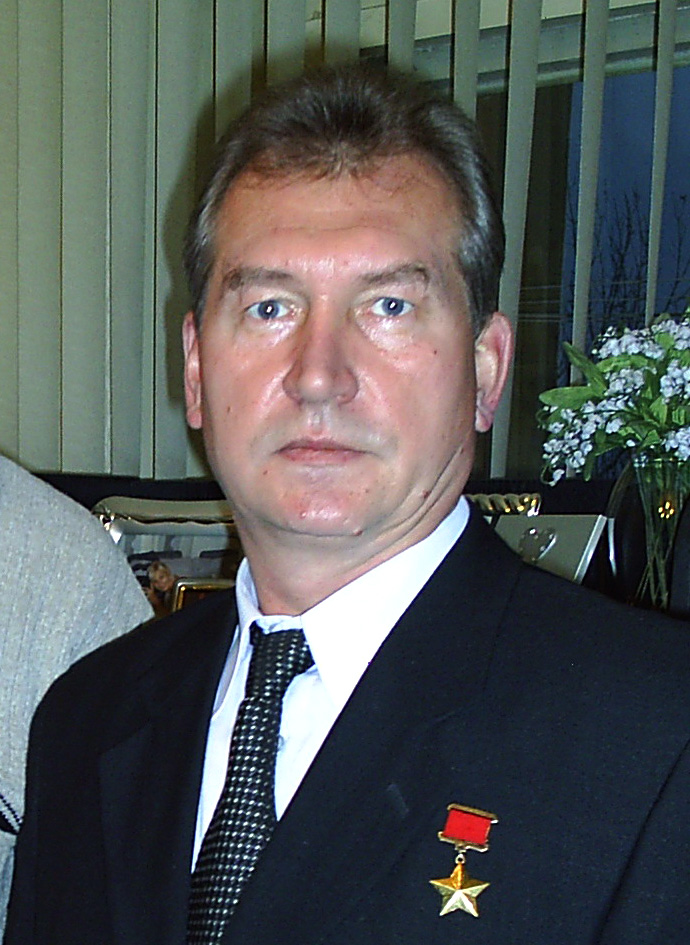
- Solodkov in 2005
- Native name: Леонид Михайлович Солодков
- Born: 10 April 1958 (age 68); Chornukhyne, Luhansk Oblast, Ukrainian SSR, Soviet Union
- Allegiance: Soviet Union; Russia
- Branch: Soviet Navy; Russian Navy
- Service years: 1976–1994
- Rank: Captain 2nd rank
- Awards: Hero of the Soviet Union; Order of Lenin; Order of the Red Banner

Leonid Mikhailovich Solodkov (Russian: Леонид Михайлович Солодков; born 10 April 1958) is a retired Russian Navy Captain 2nd rank and a Hero of the Soviet Union. Solodkov was awarded the title on 24 December 1991 for his work on diving equipment. Solodkov is the last person awarded the title, having received it two days before the dissolution of the Soviet Union.

== Early life ==
Solodkov was born on 10 April 1958 in Chornukhyne, Luhansk Oblast in a farming family. His childhood was spent in Volzhsky, Volgograd Oblast, where he graduated from tenth grade. In 1976, he graduated from a course at the Obninsk Branch of the Moscow Engineering and Physics Institute.

== Military service ==
Solodkov joined the Soviet Navy in August 1976. He was sent to the Higher Naval Engineering College. In 1980, Solodkov became a member of the Communist Party of the Soviet Union. He graduated from the college in June 1981. In November, he completed the 6th Higher Officer Classes of the Navy. Solodkov became commander of the diving team on the rescue ship Zangezur. Between 1984 and 1986 he was assistant commander for rescue work on the Zangezur. Solodkov prepared over 1,000 deep-divers in diving school and while serving in Algeria supervised the training of submarine crews in emergency rescue.

In May 1986, he became a junior researcher and diving specialist at the State Scientific Research Institute of Rescue, Diving, and Deep Sea Work of the Ministry of Defense. Solodkov participated in the creation and testing of diving equipment. While testing new technology, he spent a long period under 50-atmosphere pressure. Solodkov worked underwater and in the diving chamber for more than 3,000 hours. Solodkov spent 15 days underwater at 500 meters during a 1991 experiment and 25 days at 450 meters in a 1988 experiment. He was awarded the Order of the Red Banner on 25 July 1990. On 24 December 1991, Solodkov was awarded the title Hero of the Soviet Union and the Order of Lenin for his contributions to diving. Solodkov was the last person awarded the title, receiving it two days before the dissolution of the Soviet Union. Then with the Russian Navy, Solodkov received his Gold Star on 16 January 1992 from Yevgeny Shaposhnikov.

== Later life ==
In July 1994 Solodkov transferred to the reserve with the Captain 3rd rank rank. He was promoted to Captain 2nd rank in 1999. Solodkov lives in Saint Petersburg. He led the Public Council of the Krasnoselsky District Administration. Solodkov was later deputy chairman of the Coordinating Council of Heroes of the Soviet Union, an NGO.
