= Richard Tesařík =

Czech military commander and war hero

- Born: 3 December 1915 Prague, Bohemia, Austria-Hungary
- Died: 27 March 1967 (aged 51) Ústí nad Labem, Czechoslovakia
- Rank: Major-General
- Conflicts: World War II
- Awards: Hero of the Soviet Union; Czechoslovak War Cross

Richard Tesařík (3 December 1915 – 27 March 1967) was a Czech military commander and World War II hero. He attained the rank of Major-General.

== Career ==
Tesařík first emigrated to Poland after the occupation of Czechoslovakia and then, at the outbreak of World War II, fled to the Soviet Union.

He became commander of an infantry platoon in the Battle of Sokolovo (1943) and later a commander of a tank battalion, during which time he fought in the Battle of Kiev (1943), Battle of Dukla Pass (1944) and in the Ostrava Offensive (1945). He also became a Hero of the Soviet Union.

== Awards ==
=== Soviet state awards ===
- Hero of the Soviet Union (21 December 1943)
- Order of Lenin (21 December 1943)
- Order of the Red Star (1945)

=== Czechoslovak State Awards ===
- five Military Crosses
- Order of the White Lion "For Victory"
- Order of the Slovak National Uprising, I degree
- two Orders of the Red Banner of the Czechoslovak Republic
- medal "For Bravery in front of the enemy" (November 08, 1945)
- Medal of Merit of the first degree (1945)
- medal "For Service to the Motherland"
- medal "For Merits in the fight against fascism"
- Sokolov Memorial Medal (1948)
- Dukla Memorial Medal (1959)

=== Awards from other countries ===
- Order of Virtuti Militari (Poland)
- Order of the Crown of Romania (Romania)

== Death and legacy ==
He died on 27 March 1967. He was buried at the cemetery in the town of Příbram, Czech Republic.

Busts have been installed in Příbram and on the Alley of Heroes on the Dukla Pass:

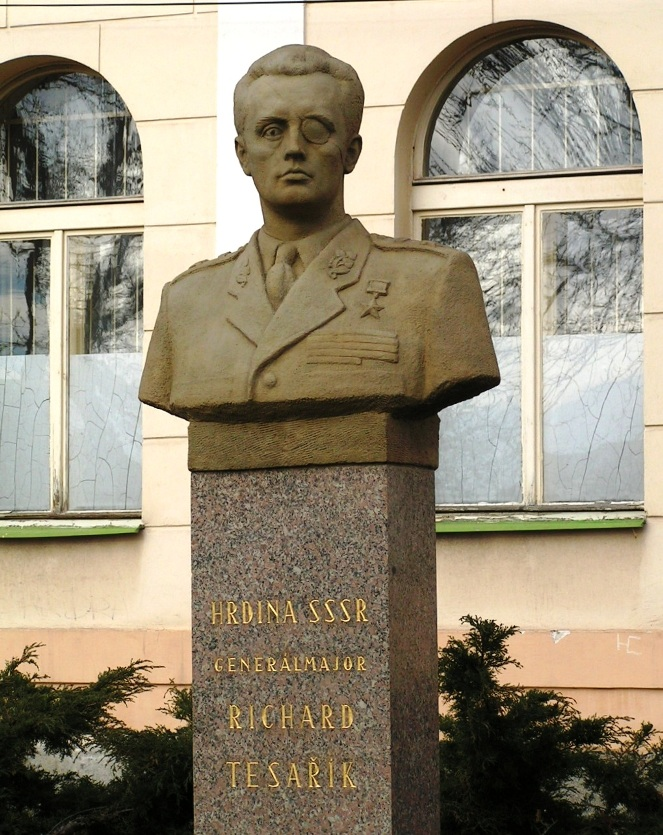
Bust in Příbram, Czech Republic

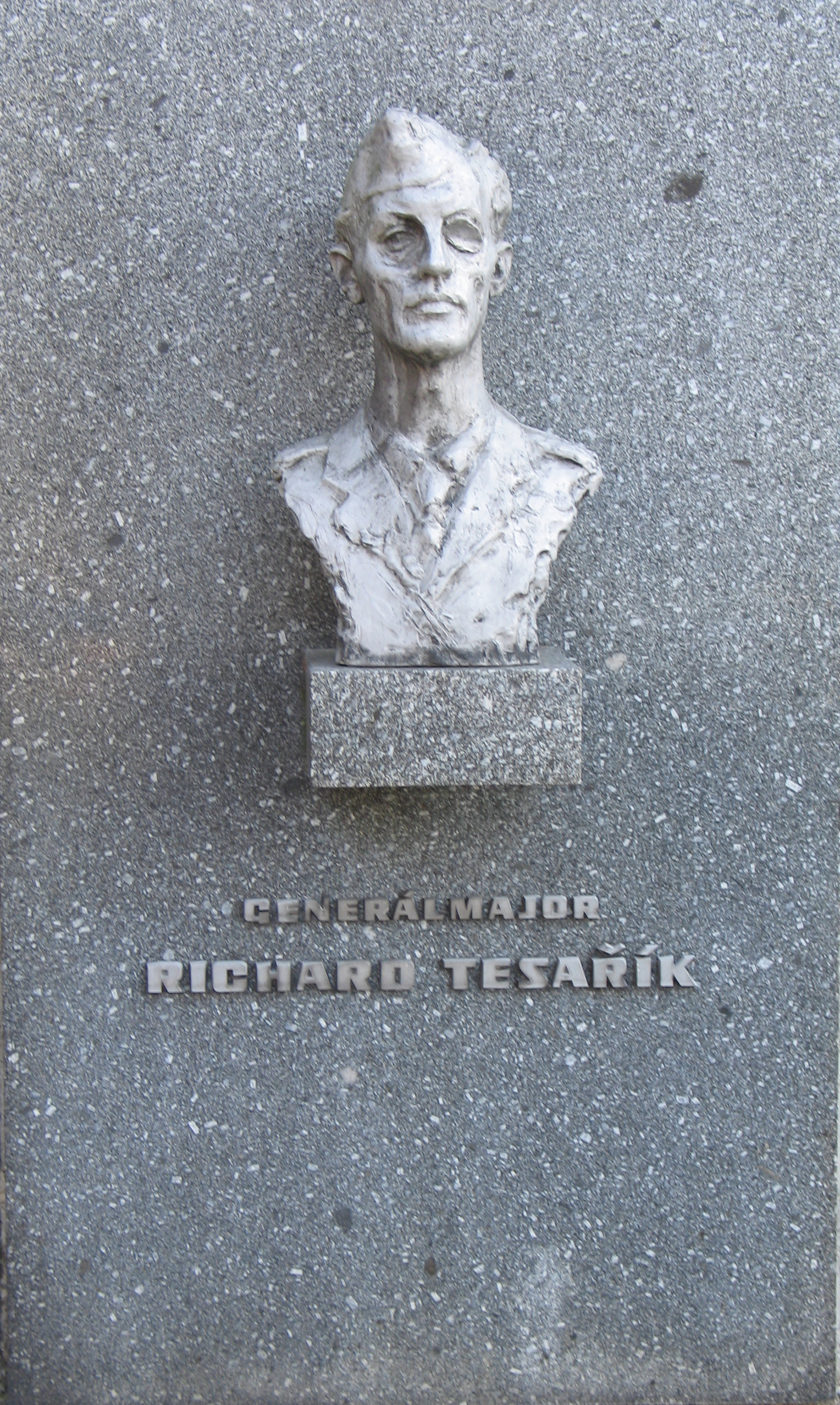
Bust on the Alley of Heroes on the Dukla Pass, Slovakia
