= Stěpan Vajda =

Czechoslovak soldier (1922–1945)

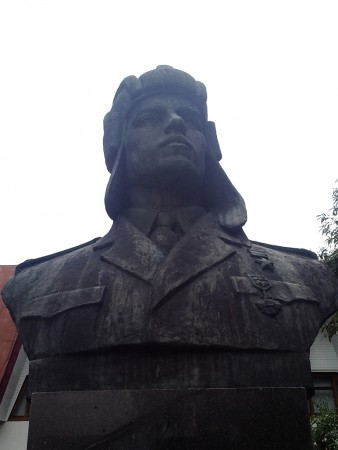
- A bust of Vajda in Ukraine
- Born: January 17, 1922 selo Dulovo, then Czechoslovak Socialist Republic
- Died: April 6, 1945 (aged 23); Tworków

Stěpan Vajda (17 January 1922 – 6 April 1945) was a Czechoslovak officer. He was commander of a tank battalion in the 1st Czechoslovak Army Corps, which was part of the Red Army during World War II. He was posthumously awarded Hero of the Soviet Union.

== Awards and titles ==
=== Soviet state awards and titles ===
- Hero of the Soviet Union (10 August 1945, posthumously)
- Order of Lenin (10 August 1945, posthumously)
- Order of Glory, 3rd class (3 June 1944)

=== Czechoslovak state awards ===
- two military crosses
- Order of the White Lion "For Victory" I degree
- Medal "For Bravery"
- Sokolovo commemorative medal (1948, posthumously)

== Honours ==
He was buried in the Polish village of Pogrzebień. In 1948 the ashes were reburied in Ostrava, where a monument was erected.

In the native village of Dulovo and in the city of Tiachiv there are busts of a tanker. In Opava, Czech Republic, and in Tworków, Poland, where Vajda died, monuments to Vajda were erected. In the tank school in Opava and in the village of Dulovo, museums were opened.

His name is given to the street in Uzhhorod.

On 9 May 1967, the frontier outpost Porayuv of the Polish Border Guard Troops was named after Stěpan Vajda.
