= Vasily Petrov (general) =

Vasily Stepanovich Petrov
- Василь Степанович Петров
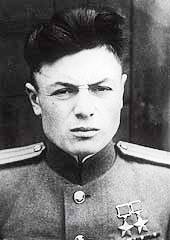
- Born: 5 March 1922; Dmitrovka village, Yekaterinoslav Governorate, Ukraine SSR
- Died: 15 April 2003 (aged 81); Kyiv, Ukraine
- Military career
- Allegiance: Soviet Union; Ukraine
- Branch: Artillery
- Rank: Colonel-general
- Conflicts: World War II
- Awards: Hero of the Soviet Union (twice)

Vasily Stepanovich Petrov (Ukrainian: Василь Степанович Петров, Russian: Василий Степанович Петров; 5 March 1922 – 15 April 2003) was an officer in the Red Army, and later, the Ukrainian Armed Forces, who lost both his hands during the Battle for the Burkin Bridgehead. After becoming a double amputee he continued to serve in World War II. For his actions in the war he was twice been awarded the title Hero of the Soviet Union and promoted to the rank of major. Despite his injuries, he went on to become a general and hold a variety of command posts.

== Early life ==
Petrov was born in 1922 to a Russian peasant family in the village of Dmitrovka, located in present-day Ukraine. His father Stepan Petrov, who had fought on the side of the white guards during the civil war, was arrested when Vasily was a young child. His mother died when he was only three and his stepmother abandoned him and his siblings. A neighbor briefly took care of them before telling the two brothers to go an orphanage, which they later escaped from. His brother died while they were running away, but eventually Vasily made it to his stepmother's village and was taken care of. Soon after completing secondary school in 1939 he was drafted into the Red Army. After graduating from the Sumy Artillery School in 1941 he was assigned to the 92nd Separate Artillery Division.

== World War II ==
Having been in combat since June 1941, Petrov fought on the Southern, Voronezh and 1st Ukrainian fronts. As deputy commander of the 1850th Anti-tank Artillery Regiment he participated in the battles for the Left-bank Ukraine and the Dniper. He saw heavy combat in the crossing of the Sula river on 14 September 1943, during which his unit faced a constant barrage of artillery fire and bombing while trying to launch three ferries but faced opposition were forced to confront thirteen tanks. After destroying seven German tanks and forcing them to expend their ammunition they were able to continue the advance while then enemy retreated and deployed machine gunners. When German gunners encircled a battery of his regiment, he and other Soviet soldiers participated in a two-hour-long battle against encircling forces. In the end, the battery was able to escape the encirclement and an estimated 90 German soldiers were killed.

During battle on 23 September 1943 Petrov replaced his regimental commander and led his unit in becoming the first part of their brigade to cross the Dniepr. According to Petrov's official nomination sheet for the title Hero of the Soviet Union, he lost his hands on 1 October 1943 during the battle for the Burkhin Bridgehead on the right bank of the river, during which he helped two batteries direct counter-fire that resulted in the destruction of four enemy tanks and two mortars. He and an orderly went on to open fire on a self-propelled gun, but they were targeted with shelling. A German projectile hit Petrov and inflicted irreparable damage to both of his hands, but he refused to be evacuated to a hospital until the counterattack ceased. Postwar sources indicate that the injuries happened earlier under different circumstances and at different dates, such as in August. Petrov described the incident to the press in his later years, saying that during the battle for a bridgehead in autumn he was hit by a shell around midnight; his colleagues had at one point believed him to be dead and ordered a search for his remains, but found him alive in the morning. His comrades ordered a surgeon to operate on him, who warned them that Petrov would probably die. Despite his low chances of survival he lived through the surgery and a few weeks later he was sent to the Moscow Institute of Orthopedics and Prosthetics. On 24 December 1943 he was awarded the title Hero of the Soviet Union. While in Moscow he became very depressed and contemplated suicide, but eventually came to terms with his condition and practiced writing, having received many letters of encouragement from other soldiers.

Due to the extent of his injuries he remained in the hospital for over a months and was offered a civilian job as the deputy party secretary in a district of Moscow, but he requested to return to the army. In December 1944 Petrov returned to the army with the rank of major as deputy commander of the 248th Guards Destroyer Anti-Tank Artillery Regiment of the 11th Guards Destroyer Anti-Tank Artillery Brigade of the 1st Ukrainian Front's 52nd Army . He took part in the Vistula–Oder offensive and the subsequent battles for the Oder bridgeheads as a deputy regimental commander, and allegedly repelled five enemy counterattacks during one battle on 9 March 1945. In April that Petrov was made commander of the 248th Anti-tank Artillery Regiment. He was awarded a second Hero of the Soviet Union Gold Star after the end of the war, on 27 June.

== Postwar ==
Petrov remained in the military after the surrender of Nazi Germany. He graduated from Lviv State University in 1954 and became a Candidate of Military Sciences. Having been promoted to the rank of General-lieutenant in 1977 he held various high positions in the Soviet military, serving as the deputy chief of the missile troops and artillery of the Carpathian Military District. After the dissolution of the Soviet Union he served in the military of Ukraine and was promoted to the rank of Colonel-General in 1999.

Despite his prestige as a war hero, he did not always remain in line with the communist party; he was known for not paying party dues, and after not signing his membership paperwork he was expelled from the party and questioned about his loyalty before it was eventually agreed that he could permit someone to sign the paperwork on his behalf.

He died on 15 April 2003 in Kyiv and was buried in the Baikove Cemetery.

== Awards and honors ==
Soviet:

- Twice Hero of the Soviet Union
- Two Order of Lenin
- Order of the October Revolution
- Order of the Red Banner
- Order of the Patriotic War 1st class
- Three Order of the Red Star

Other states:

- Poland - Virtuti militari 5th class
- Russia - Order of Friendship
- Ukraine - Order of Bogdan Khmelnitsky 2nd class
