= Primo Gibelli =

Italian Communist, immigrant to the Soviet Union, and fighter pilot

- Nicknames: José Antonio Galarza "Cordero"
- Born: 27 December 1893; Milan, Kingdom of Italy
- Died: 10 November 1936 (aged 42) Alcorcón, Second Spanish Republic
- Allegiance: Soviet Union; Spanish Republic
- Branch: Red Army; Soviet Air Force
- Service years: 1921–1933; 1936
- Rank: Captain
- Conflicts: Basmachi revolt Spanish Civil War
- Awards: Hero of the Soviet Union

Primo Gibelli (27 December 1893 – 10 November 1936) was an Italian Communist, immigrant to the Soviet Union, and fighter pilot who was awarded the title Hero of the Soviet Union after his death in the Spanish Civil War.

== Early life ==
Gibelli was born on 27 December 1893 to an Italian family in Milan. Initially he worked at a FIAT aircraft engine factory and took part in political rallies, protesting against Italian invasion of Libya and celebrating the October Revolution. After being arrested in 1917 for participating in a "seditious" demonstrations, but he was soon released and continued to engage in politics, supporting the labour movement against the blackshirts in the Biennio Rosso. Before emigrating to Soviet Russia in 1921 due to the rise of Mussolini he was an active supporter of the Italian Communist Party immediately upon its foundation.

== Military career ==
Having arrived in Moscow, he initially worked as a driver while studying Russian before volunteering for the Red Army; he then became a cadet at a rifle school before being deployed in Ukraine. Soon he was promoted to commander of an armored car after repairing it when it suffered an engine failure. Having been admitted to the Communist Party in November that year, he went on to pursue an aviation career, first at the Zaraisk Aviation School and later at the Kachin Military Aviation School of Pilots. After graduating he was assigned to a military squadron; there he flew reconnaissance sorties against the Bashmachi revolt in Central Asia. During one mission in 1926 he was shot down and captured by the Basmachis, but managed to escape by hijacking the plane of a British military advisor and flying it to Soviet controlled territory, for which he was awarded the Order of the Red Banner. For rescuing fishermen in the Sea of Azov in 1928 he received a certificate of appreciation and an honorary weapon from the All-Russian Central Executive Committee.

In 1933 he became a test pilot at the Air Force Research Institute, but was soon dismissed after a plane crash as result of an unsuccessful attempt to fly an airplane under a Moscow River bridge. After recovering from his injuries he worked as an aircraft engine mechanic and at an automobile factory. Later in 1936 he re-entered the military to fly in the Spanish Civil War as part of a group of Soviet volunteers. There, he piloted a French Potez-54 bomber and took on a Spanish name, although his colleagues usually referred to him by his nickname "Cordero". On 10 November 1936 his plane was shot down, although it is unclear if he was shot down by an enemy fighter or anti-aircraft artillery, and crashed northeast of the city of Alcorcón. He was posthumously awarded the title Hero of the Soviet Union on 31 December 1936.

The exact circumstances of his death are unclear. Official Soviet accounts state that he was captured by Francoist forces after parachuting from his burning plane, who subsequently dismembered him with an axe while alive and then dropped a tarp with the remains and an intimidating note over a Republican position in Madrid. However, the official account is disputed by various parties, who have proposed several alternative theories about the circumstances: such as being the entire crew being killed immediately after the plane crashed and one of the bodies was dismembered postmortem; the crew was killed by the impact of their plane crashing, and the story about the dismembered remains being dropped was a staged Republican propaganda stunt conducted using remains of a Madrid worker to died in a bombing; or a Soviet volunteer pilot was tortured and dismembered, but it may not have been Gibelli (possibly Vladimir Bocharov or Konstantin Kovtun).
