= Fritz Schmenkel =

German communist (1916–1944)

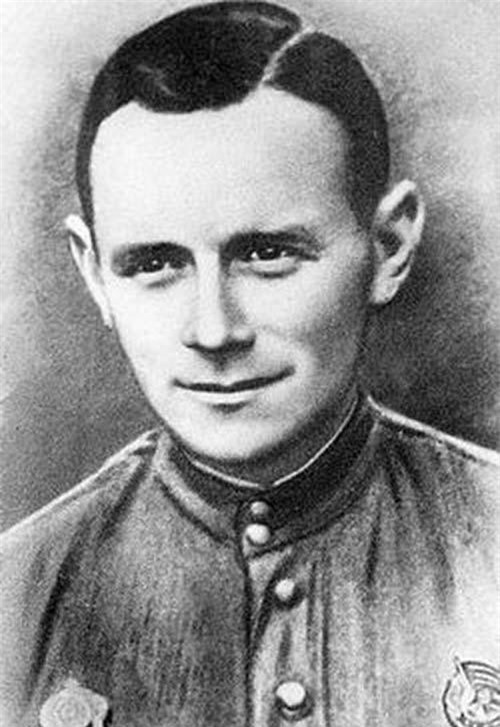
- Fritz Schmenkel
- Born: Fritz Paul Schmenkel; 14 February 1916; Warsow bei Stettin, German Empire
- Died: 22 February 1944 (aged 28); Minsk, German-occupied Byelorussian SSR, Soviet Union
- Other name: 'Ivan Ivanovich'
- Spouse: Erna Schäfer
- Military career
- Allegiance: Nazi Germany (1938–41); Soviet Union (1941–44)
- Branch: German Army (1938–41); Soviet Army (1941–44)
- Service years: 1938–1944
- Conflicts: World War II; Operation Barbarossa
- Awards: Hero of the Soviet Union (1964); Order of Lenin (1964); Order of the Red Banner (1943)

Fritz Paul Schmenkel (14 February 1916 – 22 February 1944) was a German communist and resistance fighter against Nazism, who fought alongside the Soviet partisans in German-occupied Byelorussia during World War II.

== Biography ==
Fritz Schmenkel was born in Stettin (today Szczecin, Poland) in 1916. His father, Paul Krause, a brickyard worker and communist, was murdered by SA members in 1932. This caused Fritz to join the Young Communist League of Germany.

After working in several different jobs, Schmenkel was conscripted into the Wehrmacht in December 1938. There, he was trained to become a Kanonier. His dislike of military discipline, opposition to Nazism and being absent without leave led to him being imprisoned several times, culminating in a sentence of 18 months' imprisonment, which he served in a military prison in Torgau. In July 1941, after the beginning of Nazi Germany's invasion of the Soviet Union, Schmenkel volunteered to fight on the Eastern Front, and he was released from prison.

While serving in Belarus in November 1941, Schmenkel deserted and went into hiding near the village of Podmoshe (Yartsevsky District, Smolensk Oblast). He made contact with a Soviet partisan unit named "Death to Fascism". Despite their initial suspicions and repeated interrogations, Schmenkel convinced the partisans that he had a genuine desire to fight against the Nazis. He won their trust by killing a German soldier who, by coincidence, attempted to set fire to the house where the partisans had their base. Schmenkel was accepted as a member of the partisans, who gave him the nom de guerre "Ivan Ivanovich" (or Vanya – the short form of Ivan).

Schmenkel proved himself to be valuable to the partisans; wearing captured German uniforms, including one belonging to a Wehrmacht general, Schmenkel led German military units into ambushes arranged by the partisans. This helped the partisans capture entire units of Wehrmacht soldiers, as well as ammunition and food. Schmenkel quickly rose through the ranks of the partisans. In March 1943, he travelled to Moscow at the behest of the Red Army, was awarded the Order of the Red Banner and received further military training. He was appointed deputy commander of a special operations (sabotage and intelligence) unit, which operated in a German-occupied area north of the city of Orsha.

In December 1943, Schmenkel was captured by German forces. He was taken to Minsk, where a German military court sentenced him to death on 15 February 1944; he was executed by firing squad a week later.

== Awards ==
- Hero of the Soviet Union (6 October 1964; posthumously)
- Order of Lenin (6 October 1964; posthumously)
- Order of the Red Banner (1943)
- Medal "To a Partisan of the Patriotic War", 2nd degree (1942)

== Legacy ==
A street in Nelidovo, Nelidovsky District, Kalinin Oblast (today Tver Oblast), was named after Fritz Schmenkel in 1965. In 1976, a street in the Karlshorst locality of Berlin was named Fritz-Schmenkel-Straße; however, it was renamed Rheinsteinstraße in 1992. There is still one Fritz-Schmenkel-Straße in Leipzig and one in Torgau. A commemorative plaque has been placed on the house on Victory Square in Minsk, where Schmenkel was sentenced to death by the German occupants in 1944.

A film about Schmenkel, titled Ich will euch sehen (I Want To See You), was made in 1978.

== Personal life ==
Schmenkel was married to Erna Schäfer. Together, they had three children: a son, Hans, and two daughters, Ursula and Christa.
