= Vladimir Zaimov =

Bulgarian general (1888–1942)

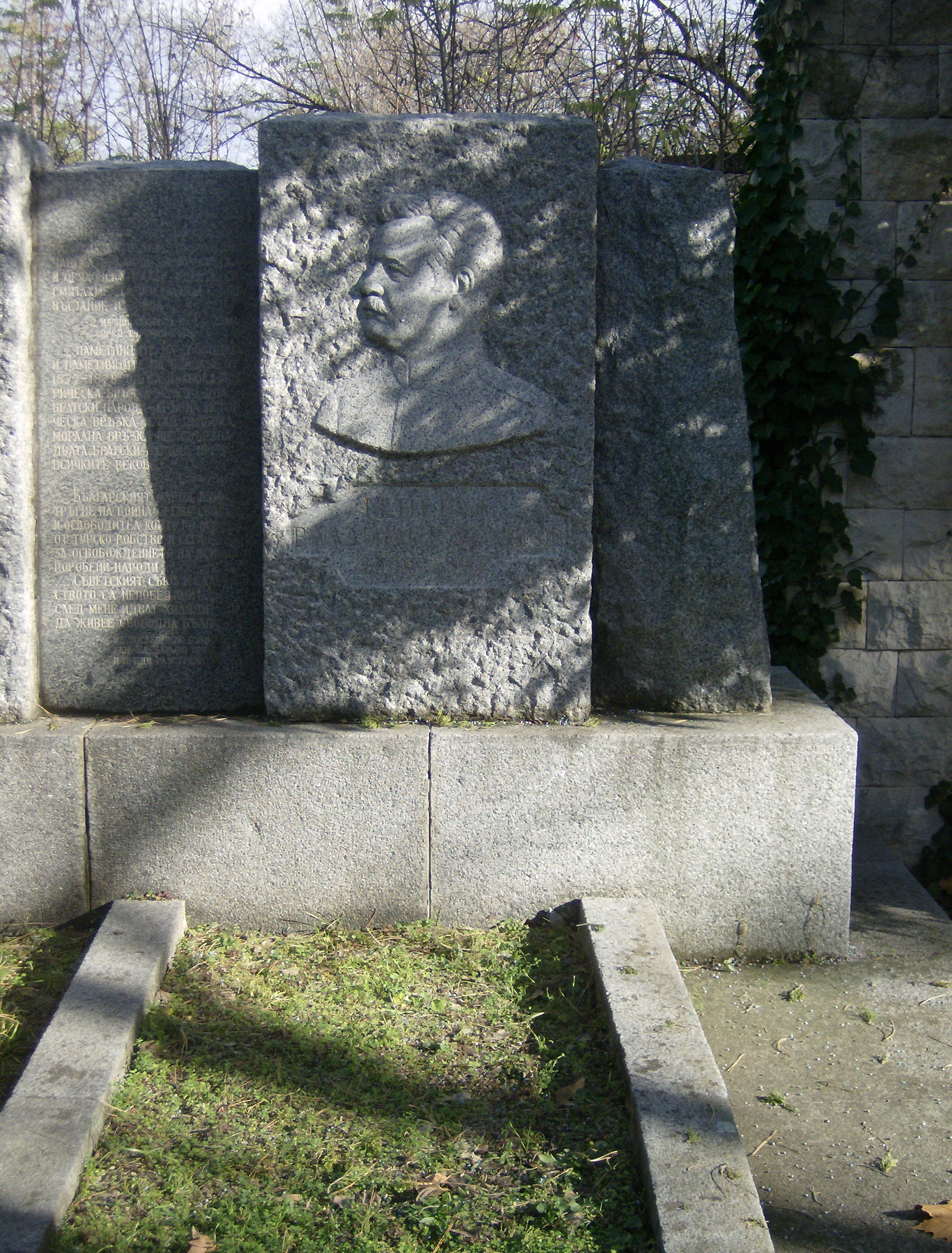
- Monument Vladimir Zaimov, Pleven
- Born: Vladimir Stoyanov Zaimov; 8 December 1888; Kyustendil, Bulgaria
- Died: 3 June 1942 (aged 53)
- Military career
- Allegiance: Bulgaria → Red Army
- Service years: 1939–1942
- Conflicts: Balkan Wars; World War I World War II
- Awards: Hero of the Soviet Union

Vladimir Stoyanov Zaimov (8 December 1888 – 3 June 1942) was a Bulgarian general who acted as a Soviet spy in the Kingdom of Bulgaria. He was made Hero of the Soviet Union for his actions against the Axis forces.

== Biography ==
Vladimir Zaimov was born on 8 December 1888 in Kyustendil to Stoyan Zaimov, an April Uprising participant. In 1907 he graduated from Royal Officers’ College and from 1912 to 1913 served in the Balkan Wars and World War I. In 1927 he helped built artillery in his native country and by 1934 he was in charge of Military League. A year later, he was relocated to a reserve in which later on he was imprisoned. On 16 October the same year he became major general and became Military alliance secretary as well. From 1935 to 1936 he was charged with an assassination attempt on General Damyan Velchev, but the charges were dropped due to the lack of evidence. When the war started, he was given orders by the Soviet Communist Party to resist the German occupation, but was later on arrested on 22 March 1942 on the charges of espionage and was sentenced next day. On 3 June 1942 he asked for a pardon from Boris III, but was declined and that day executed. In May 1945 he was rehabilitated by the Sofia Court House at the People's Tribunal of the Fatherland Front.

In 1944 he was awarded the rank of colonel general (posthumously).

In 1972, Zaimov's reports and documents were declassified. After that, his contribution was re-evaluated and he became Hero of the Soviet Union.

== Awards and honours ==
- Order of Bravery (1913)
- Order of the Red Banner (1966)
- Order of Lenin – May 30, 1972 (posthumously)
- Hero of the Soviet Union – May 30, 1972 (posthumously)

In People's Republic of Bulgaria there are streets, squares and schools named after Vladimir Zaimov.

== Sources ==
- Владимир Заимов (1888–1942) // Герои-интернационалисты / сост. В. В. Тян. М., «Просвещение», 1991. стр.120–129
