= Mochi (surname) =

Mochi is an Italian surname. Notable people with the surname include:

- Clara Mochi (born 1956), Italian fencer
- Fabio Mochi (born 1957), Italian designer
- Francesco Mochi (1580–1654), Italian Baroque sculptor
- Juan Mochi (1831–1892), Italian painter
- Orazio Mochi (1571–1625), Italian sculptor of the late-Mannerist period, active mainly in Florence
- Ugo Mochi (1889–1977), Italian illustrator, sculptor and designer
- Xochi Mochi, American drag queen
- Lucy Mochi (born 2001), Chinese-American adult film actress and model
