= Hervé Désarbre =

French organist (born 1957)

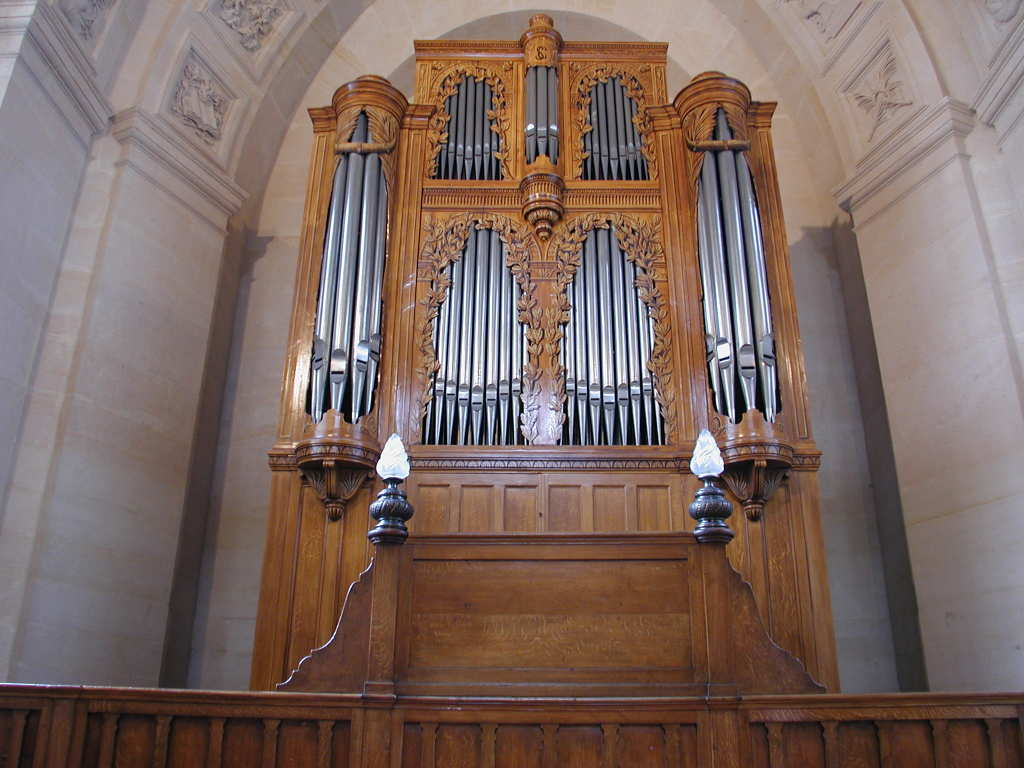
Organ of Église Notre-Dame du Val-de-Grâce

Hervé Désarbre (born in 1957) is a French organist and organiste du ministère de la Défense [organist of the Ministry of Armed Forces]. He is titular of the Cavaillé-Coll organ of the Église Notre-Dame du Val-de-Grâce in Paris.

== Biography ==
Born in Roanne (Loire), Desarbre studied the piano with Madeleine David, a student of the organist and composer Aloÿs Claussmann, and then worked with André Chometon, professor at the conservatoire de Lyon.

In parallel with his law studies, he turned to the organ and entered master André Fleury's organ class at the Schola Cantorum de Paris. He also sought the advice of Guy Morançon. In 1975, he was appointed organist of the Saint-Louis de Roanne church and, in 1982, honorary organist of the historical organ of Renaison. In 1993, he was appointed titular organist of the historic church of Val-de Grace in Paris, and in 2005, he received the title of organist of the Ministry of Defence (Protocole Culture-Défense). In 2004, he created with the composer François Vercken, the vocal ensemble La Chapelle-Musique du Val-de-Grâce.

He has participated in several radio and television broadcasts and has played as soloist with various choirs, musical ensembles and orchestras in France and abroad. (Orchestre de la Garde républicaine, brass Quintet of Radio France, mastery of the Primatiale Saint-Jean de Lyon, Choir of the Orchestre de Paris, Groupe Vocal de France, and abroad, the Baltica Philharmony, the Tadeusz Baird Philharmony, the State Academic Symphony Orchestra of the Russian Federation, etc.). He has performed in Paris (Val-de-Grâce, Notre-Dame de Paris, La Madeleine, Saint-Eustache), in France, Russia, Ukraine, Uzbekistan, Great Britain, Italy, Belgium, Serbia, Germany, Poland, Spain, Ukraine, Spain. In Moscow, he has already performed several times, alone or with an orchestra, in the big hall of the Moscow Conservatory (whose Medal of Honour he received), the Tchaikovsky Hall and the Glinka Museum. In August 2014, he was appointed to the international committee of experts for the restoration of the Cavaillé-Coll Grand Organ by the rector of the Moscow Conservatory. In February 2015, he was invited to play at the Sochi Festival, directed by Yuri Bashmet. In September 2017, he directed the opening concert of the Tchaikovsky Conservatory's "French Seasons" festival in Moscow.

His recitals are mainly devoted to French music of the nineteenth and twentieth centuries as well as Italian and Russian musics. Also interested in today's music, he has created a number of contemporary works for organ alone or with orchestra, some of them dedicated to him. (Ivan Jevtić, François Vercken, Guy Morançon, François-Henri Houbart, Aubert Lemeland, Yuri Kasparov, Dimitri Yanov-Yanovsky, Pierre Cholley, Julien Bret, Andrés Laprida, etc.). Nicolas Bacri and Jacques Boisgallais also dedicated to him chamber music works.

Désarbre is a member of several French and international juries (including the Schola Cantorum, the Shostakovich competition, the Edison Denisov competition, etc.), of the musical commission of the French Ministry of Defence, and artistic director of the Le Chant du Monde publishing house. He is also a member of the Camillians family (Order of regular clergy for the sick).

On 26 July 2008, Désarbre was invited to the 50th anniversary of the twinning of Reutlingen with Roanne. Thus he gave a recital to the keyboards of the new organ of the church of Saint Wolfgang with the concert Le Tour du monde en 80 minutes ! De Reutlingen à Moscou en passant par Roanne et New York to mark the centenary of the birth of Olivier Messiaen. Recently in Paris, he created for piano, with the vocal ensemble La Chapelle-Musique of the Val-de-Grâce, the musical setting, by Pierre Cholley, of the famous recipe escalope de saumon à l'oseille of the Troisgros brothers, in the presence of Pierre Troisgros. In May 2013, he was invited to play in Renaison for the thirty years of the installation of the historical John Abbey organ.

In 2008, Désarbre was a member of the jury of the International Organ Competition Alexander Goedicke, organized by the Tchaikovsky Conservatory of Moscow and the International Chamber Music Competition Sergei Taneyev. He also chaired the Edison Denisov International Composition Competition in Moscow and again presided over it in 2016. He recently founded with former Schola Cantorum classmates the Association André Fleury of which he is the general secretary.

He has been welcomed as field officer into the military reserve.

== Discography ==
1. L'orgue et l'enfance, Mandala
2. L'orgue et la danse, Mandala
3. Concertos français pour orgue et cordes, Mandala
4. L'orgue insolite, Mandala
5. François Vercken, Œuvres pour orgue seul, et concerto pour orgue, De Plein Vent
6. François Vercken, Le Lucernaire, Pavane
7. Aloÿs Claussmann, Mandala
8. La musique médiévale d'Erik Satie, Mandala
9. Hommage à André Fleury, Intégral Classic.
10. Shostakovich, Le Chant du Monde
11. Chants de la synagogue, with Adolphe Attia, tenor, Le Chant du Monde
12. Musique liturgique juive, with Adolphe Attia, tenor, Le Chant du Monde
13. Les grandes fêtes liturgiques juives, with Adolphe Attia, tenor, Le Chant du Monde
14. Les Voix de Pâques, with Adolphe Attia, tenor, Sony
15. Mendelssohn, Psalm Hora Est, EMI

== Some world premieres ==
- Julien Bret: La valse des Anges, La valse des Colombes, La ronde des Lutins, Concerto pour orgue et cordes, Images de Paris, Oliver Twist, San Camillo, Bouillabaisse, Cervelas en brioche
- Régis Campo: Maschera
- Pierre Cholley: Rumba sur les grands-jeux, Concetti pour orgue, La licorne
- Pascal Duc: Sonata
- François-Henri Houbart: La habanera du général, Bast
- Ivan Jevtic: La révélation de la Lumière
- Youri Kasparov: Obélisque, concerto for organ and symphonic orchestra, Lontano, for organ and tape
- Andrès Laprida: Samba pour orgue, Florinda.
- Aubert Lemeland: Épitaphe française, concerto for organ, trumpet and strings
- Guy Morançon: Quatre autres noëls, 13 variations sur l'hymne Veni Creator, La Tarasque, for organ, piano, chorus and percussion
- Max Pinchard: Concerto Giocoso, for organ and strings.
- Bruno Schweyer: Danses d'Eurynomée, for organ and strings
- Elżbieta Sikora: Short Stories
- François Vercken: Concerto pour orgue et ensemble instrumental, Marseillaise, vous avez dit Marseillaise, for organ
- Dimitri Yanov-Yanovsky: Concerto for organ and strings, Elf and Mirror, for organ

== Dedicated works ==
Composers Guy Morançon, François Vercken, Max Pinchard, Ramon Lazkano, Jacques Boisgallais, Nicolas Bacri, Youri Kasparov, Elżbieta Sikora, Pierre Cholley, Ivan Jevtic, Dimitry Yanov-Yanovsky, Felix Yanov-Yanovsky, Jean-Louis Petit, Merab Gagnidzé, dedicated to him works for solo organ, organ and orchestra, and chamber music.

== Honours ==
- Chevalier de l'ordre national du Mérite (13 November 2014)
- Médaille d'honneur du service de santé des armées

== Bibliography ==
1. André Fleury, le poète architecte, Prélude magazine
2. Les orgues de Roanne et sa région, éditions municipales
3. L'orgue de Cavaillé-Coll, Le Val-de-Grâce, Beaux Arts Magazine
4. "Hervé Désarbre", Dictionnaire des organistes français des XIXe et XXe siècles, Pierre Guillot, Mardaga.
