= Aloÿs Claussmann =

French organist, pianist and composer

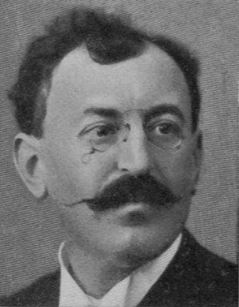
- Born: Aloïse Claussmann; 5 July 1850; Uffholtz, (Haut-Rhin)
- Died: 6 November 1926 (aged 76); Clermont-Ferrand
- Occupations: Organist; Pianist; Composer

Aloÿs Claussmann (5 July 1850 – 7 November 1926) was a French organist, pianist and composer.

== Biography ==
Born in Uffholtz, Haut-Rhin (Alsace, France), Claussmann was a pupil of organist Eugène Gigout at the École Niedermeyer de Paris, where he obtained first prizes in piano and organ, before winning the Grand Prix of the Ministry of Fine Arts in 1872. The following year, he settled in Clermont-Ferrand, where he was appointed Kapellmeister of the Clermont-Ferrand Cathedral. The new Merklin organ was inaugurated in 1877 by Edmond Lemaigre, the first holder. Claussmann succeeded him in 1888 until his death in 1926.

A virtuoso interpreter, he chose to pursue his entire career in the Puy-de-Dôme area, while a Parisian position would have been readily accessible to him. He also founded the Conservatory of Clermont-Ferrand in 1909, directing it until his death.

Although he wrote many works for piano as well as chamber music and vocal music, it is to the organ that he reserved the essential and most characteristic of his production, with about 350 compositions, fully in the post-Romantic music that he celebrated with brilliance but yet with sensitivity. He fulfilled his duties as organist of the cathedral and assumed the function of director of the Conservatory, but he also performed well-known piano concertos with the city orchestra, which he occasionally directed.

The Alsatian origin of Claussmann makes his music a unique synthesis of French and German schools, influenced by the work of César Franck and Robert Schumann.

== Works ==
A total of 544 pieces have been identified: 350 organ pieces, 113 piano pieces, 62 songs (or mélodies), 22 violin or cello pieces. Henry Lemoine was his principal publisher from 1904 to 1924. Most of his organ works are still available.

== Discography ==
- Toccata, 2 Scherzos, Minuetto, Méditation, Fantaisie héroïque, Cavatine de Raff, Antienne, and Mass for organ, by Hervé Désarbre at the historical John Abbey organ of Renaison (Mandala).
- Claussmann, pièces pour orgue, by François Clément on the organ of the city of Clermont-Ferrand (Art & Musique).
- Cortège triomphal by Willibald Guggenmos, on the organ of Wangen im Allgäu, Stadtpfarrkirche St. Martin (Psallitte).
- Pièce pour orgue by André Isoir at Hochfelden (ARDAM).
- Toccata, Op. 64, par Aitor Olea Juaristi, at the organ of Vasconia (Aarus).
- Works for piano: Sonate, Op. 45; Six pièces, Op 60; Caprice, Op. 47, par Stéphane Poyet (piano).

== Bibliography ==
- Pierre Balme, "Aloys Claussmann", in Auvergne littéraire et artistique (no. 28, Dec. 1926).
- Joseph Desaymard, "Aloys Claussmann", in Bulletin historique et scientifique de l'Auvergne (vol. LI, 1931).
- Émile Lafay, "Aloyse Claussmann", in Nouveau Dictionnaire de biographie alsacienne (vol. 69, p. 518).
- Pierre Desaymard, "Bibliographie des œuvres d'Aloys Claussmann", in Bulletin historique et scientifique de l'Auvergne (vol. 90, no. 668, January–March 1981).
