= Mochi (disambiguation) =

Mochi is a Japanese rice cake made of glutinous rice pounded into paste and molded into shape.

Mochi may also refer to:

== Food ==
- Mochi rice, a synonym for glutinous rice
  - Mochi ice cream, a confection made from mochi rice and ice cream
- Moche (food), also spelled mochi or muchi, a Filipino rice cake derived from Chinese-Filipino buchi (jian dui)

== People ==
- Mochi (Cheyenne) (c. 1841–1881), nineteenth-century Native American warrior
- Mochi (Hindu), a Hindu caste found mainly in North India
- Mochi (Muslim), a community in North India, Pakistan and Bangladesh
- Mochi (Sikh), a community found mainly in the Punjab state of India
- Mochi (surname), notable people with the surname

== Other uses ==
- Mochi (magazine), magazine and blog that aims to empower young Asian American women
- Mochi Craft, a yacht building subsidiary of the Ferretti Group
- Mochi Gate, a historical gate in Lahore, Pakistan
- Mochi language, a dialect of Central Kilimanjaro language
- Mochi Media, an advertising system and company for Adobe Flash
- Mochi Pura, a locality located within union council 128 (Faisal Town) in Gulberg Tehsil of Lahore, Punjab, Pakistan
- Uke Mochi, a goddess of food in the Shinto religion of Japan
- Mochi, a Japanese Bobtail in Big Hero 6

== See also ==
- Mocchi (disambiguation)
