= Lemaigre =

Lemaigre is a French surname. Notable people with the surname include:

- Edmond Lemaigre (1849–1890), French organist, conductor, and composer
- Jacques Lemaigre-Dubreuil (1894–1955), French activist, publisher, and businessman
- Jim Lemaigre, Canadian politician
