= John Abbey =

John Abbey may refer to:

- John Abbey (organ builder) (1785–1859), English organ builder
- John Abbey (actor) (1935–2010), American-born actor
- John Abbey (producer) (born 1945), English founder of Blues & Soul magazine and Ichiban Records
- John Roland Abbey (1894–1969), English book collector
