= Jean-Jacques Arveuf-Fransquin =

French architect

Jean Jacques Nicolas Arveuf-Fransquin
- Born: 1802; Paris, France
- Died: 1876 (aged 73–74)
- Occupation: Architect

Jean Jacques Nicolas Arveuf-Fransquin (1802–1876) was a French architect. He designed several châteaux, and undertook work on cathedrals in the French provinces.

== Early years ==
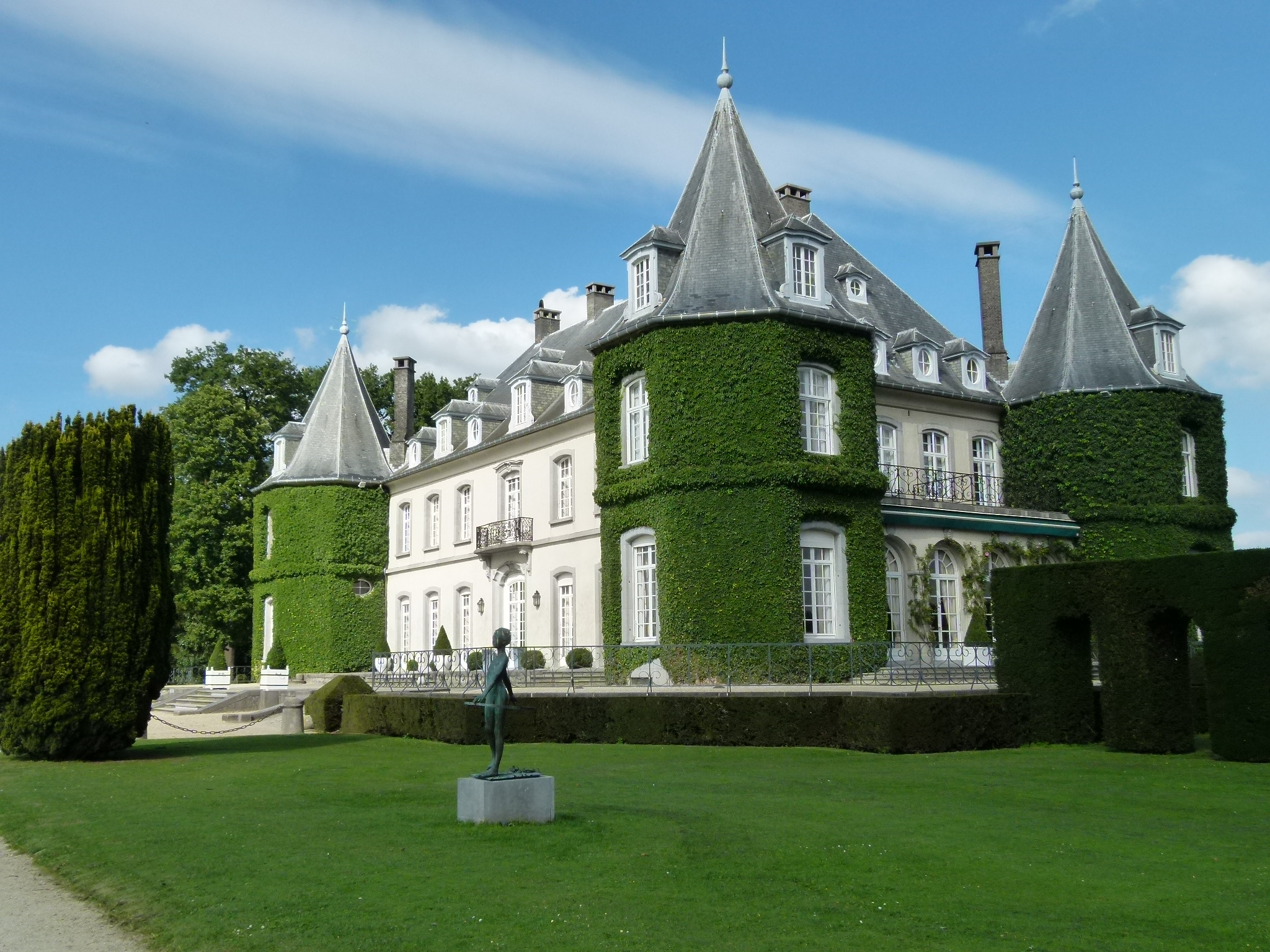
Solvay Castle

Jean Jacques Nicolas Arveuf-Fransquin was born in Paris in 1802. He was admitted to the école des Beaux-Arts in 1822. In 1830, he was assigned to work on the abbey church of Saint-Denis. In 1832, he won second prize in an open competition for an exhibition hall in Tours. That year, he was asked to report on the cathedrals of Auvergne, including those of Clermont-Ferrand, Le Puy-en-Velay and Saint-Flour, Cantal. He was also charged with maintenance of the Cathedrals of Reims, Chalons and Saint-Flour.

== Secular architecture ==
Arveuf-Fransquin and the Belgian architect Jean-François Coppens (1799–1873) were given the task of building Solvay Castle in the forest of Soinges, Belgium. It was completed in 1842. Arveuf built the Château de Boursault in the Marne valley for Madame Clicquot Ponsardin, the "Veuve Cliquot" who founded the champagne brand. It was located on the wooded summit of a hill planted with vines, and dominates the surrounding countryside and the village of Boursault. Construction began in 1843 and was completed in 1850.

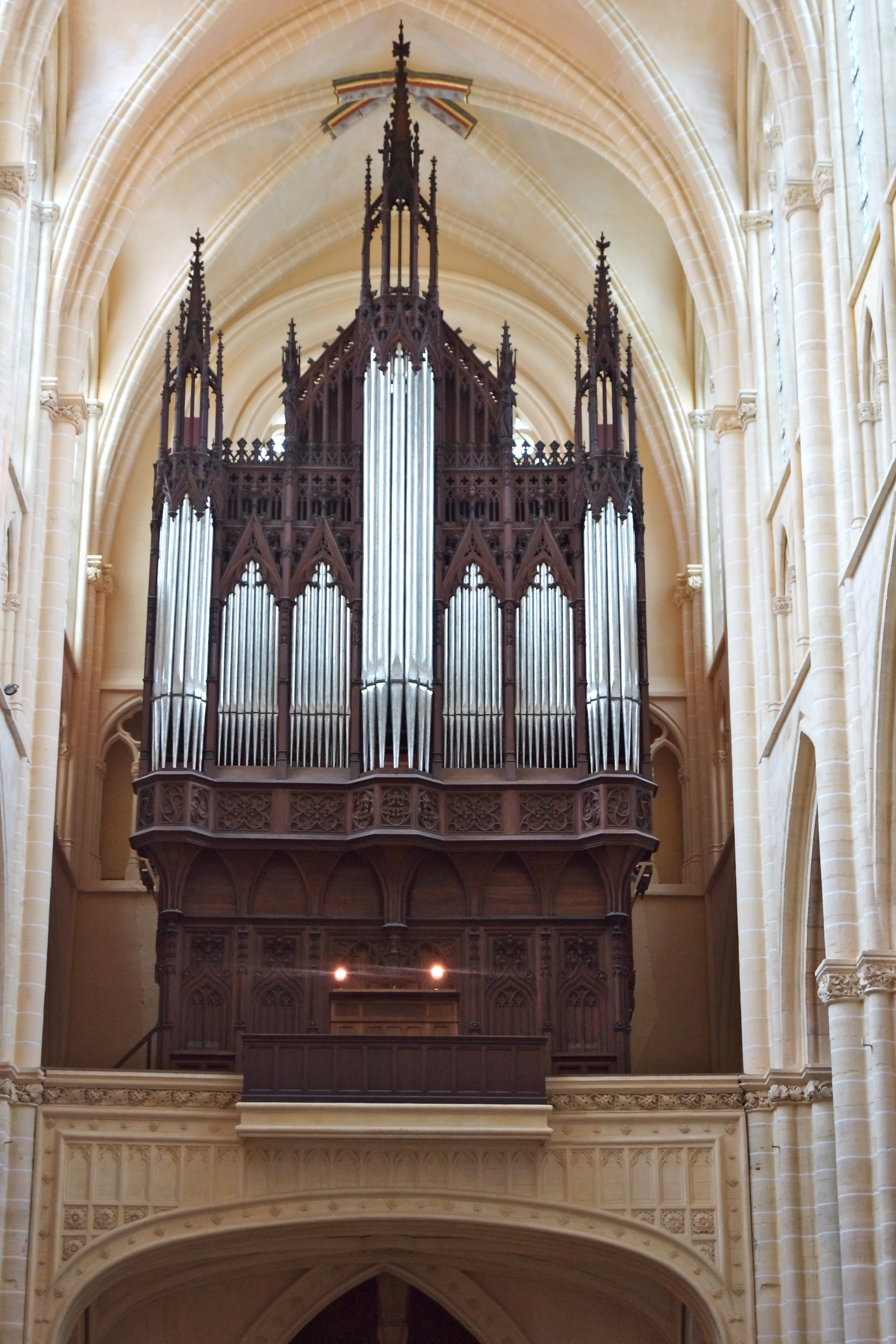
Organ of Châlons Cathedral

== Church architecture ==
In 1843, Arveuf submitted a plan for restoration of Notre-Dame de Paris in competition with Jean-Charles Danjoy and with the winning team of Jean-Baptiste Lassus and Eugène Viollet-le-Duc. Arveuf's design was criticized for slighting the historical in favor of the religious function. In 1844, Arveuf presented a project for a high altar for the cathedral of Clermont-Ferrand.

Arveuf was made diocesan architect for Reims Cathedral in 1848. Arveuf designed the neo-Flamboyant organ case of the Châlons Cathedral. The case was created by the cabinetmaker Etienne Gabriel Ventadour, and housed the instrument made by John Abbey, who delivered the instrument in 1849. In 1851, Arveuf built the churches of Eurville and Fayl-Billot in Haute-Marne. Viollet-le-Duc wrote of him in 1853 that he was known to be an excellent architect, and the works done under his leadership were well-planned and well-managed. However, he was working on outside projects and was not spending enough time at Reims. He was temporarily replaced by Viollet-le-Duc in 1860, and permanently replaced in 1862. He died in 1876.

== Sources ==
- "1850 - Château de Boursault construit par Madame Veuve Clicquot". Grandes Marques & Maisons de Champagne. UMC.
- "ARVEUF-FRANSQUIN Jean-Jacques". ENC: École nationale des chartes, Sorbonne.
- Camille, Michael (2009-06-15). The Gargoyles of Notre-Dame: Medievalism and the Monsters of Modernity. University of Chicago Press. ISBN 978-0-226-09245-4.
- Joanne, Adolphe (1868). Itinéraire général de la France: Vosges et Ardennes. L. Hachette.
- "Patrimoine / histoire" (in French). ASBL Domaine régional Solvay - Château de La Hulpe.
- Petit Futé (2014-04-08). France en avion 2014 Petit Futé (avec photos et avis des lecteurs). Petit Futé. ISBN 978-2-7469-7109-7.
- "The Cathedral Saint-Etienne: The organ". Direction Regionale des Affaires Culturelle de Champagne-Ardenne.
