= Jean-Michel Folon =

Belgian artist (1934–2005)

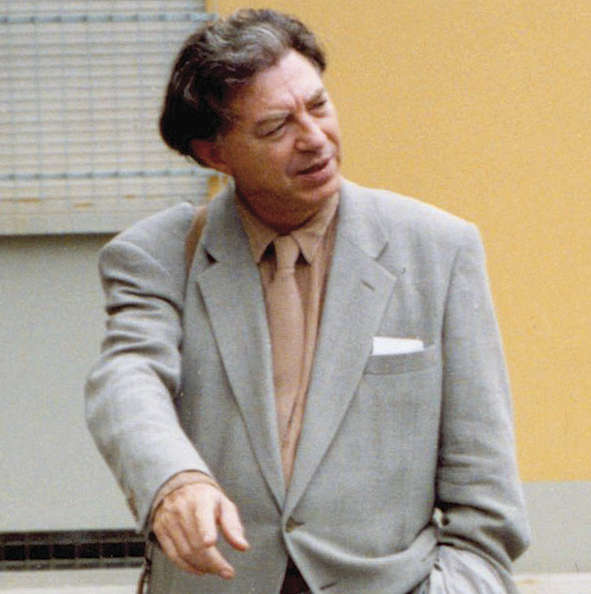
- Folon in 1990
- Born: 1 March 1934; Uccle, Brussels, Belgium
- Died: 20 October 2005 (aged 71); Monaco
- Resting place: Monaco Cemetery
- Occupation: Artist

Jean-Michel Folon (1 March 1934 – 20 October 2005) was a Belgian artist, illustrator, painter, and sculptor.

== Early life ==
Folon was born on 1 March 1934 in Uccle, Brussels, in 1934. He studied architecture at the Institut Saint-Luc.

== Career ==
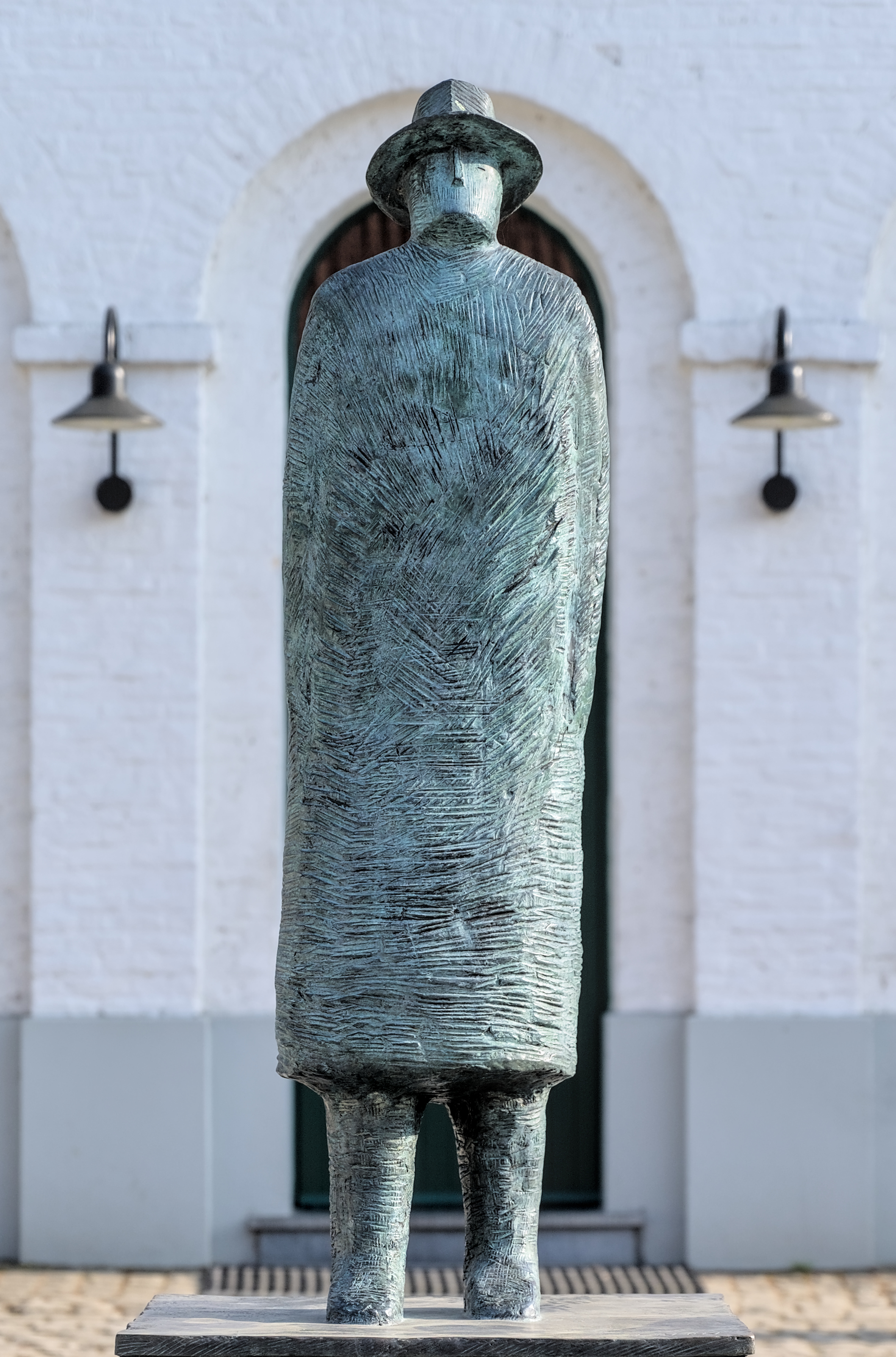
Sculpture exposed outside the Fondation Folon

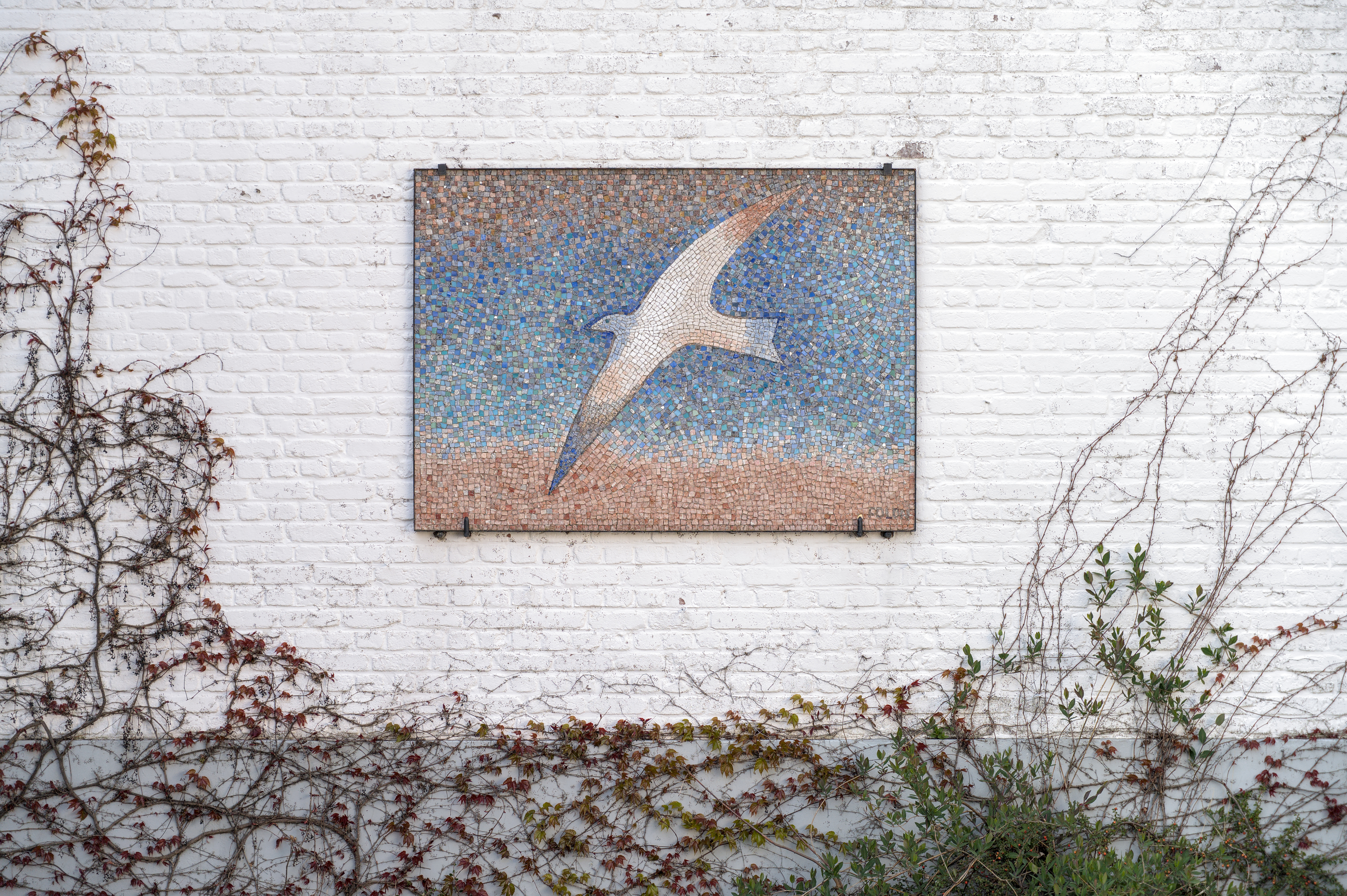
Mosaic exposed outside of the Fondation Folon

The first exhibition of his watercolors was in New York in 1969 in the Lefebre Gallery. One year later he exhibited in Tokyo and in the Il Milione gallery in Milan. He also participated in the XXVth Venice Biennale. In 1973 he joined the selection of Belgian artists in the XXVth São Paulo Biennale, where he was granted the Grand Prize in Painting. Over the years his work concentrated on different techniques, including watercolor, etching, silkscreen, illustrations, mosaics, and stained glass, which showed the diversity of his art. His work Ein Baum stirbt - Un albero muore, 1974, is by Museo Cantonale d’Arte of Lugano. He also designed numerous posters, often for humanitarian causes. Around 1988 he created his first sculptures made out of wood. He then moved on to creating sculptures in clay, plaster, bronze and marble, while continuing to paint.

Several museums dedicated exhibitions to him, among them the Musée des Arts Décoratifs in Paris in 1971, the Museum Boijmans Van Beuningen in Rotterdam in 1976, the Institute of Contemporary Arts in London in 1977, the Musée Picasso in Antibes in 1984, the Museo Correr in Venice in 1986, the Museo de Bellas Artes in Buenos Aires in 1987, the Metropolitan Museum of Art in New York in 1990, La Pedrera in Barcelona in 1993, the Bunkamura in Tokyo in 1995, the Olympic Museum in Lausanne in 1996 and the Museo Morandi in Bologna in 1996–97. In 1999 an exhibition of large sculptures was presented in the Galerie Guy Pieters, in Saint-Paul de Vence. In 2000 he opened the Fondation Folon, which presents the essentials of his work in the region he grew up in. In 2001 the city of Lisbon held a large retrospective of his sculptures in the Castelo de São Jorge, which dominates the city. In 2003 he created the designs for Puccini's La Bohème for the Puccini Festival in Italy. The president of the French Republic, Jacques Chirac, awarded him the Legion of Honour in the Palais d'Elysée. In 2004 he became a UNICEF ambassador. In 2005 the city of Florence held a grand retrospective of his work at the Palazzo Vecchio and the Forte di Belvedere.

Folon published his drawings in newspapers, mostly in the US, where he was recognized earlier than in Europe and illustrated books by Franz Kafka, Ray Bradbury, Jorge Luis Borges, Guillaume Apollinaire, Jacques Prévert, Boris Vian, Guy de Maupassant, Albert Camus, Herbert George Wells, Jean de La Fontaine and Romain Gary, under the name of Émile Ajar. He never really changed his style, whose most famous emblem is his "bird-man", but worked in various forms. Folon made murals (Magic City for the Brussels subway, 1974; Waterloo Station for the London tube, 1975), posters for theater and opera (Spoleto Festival, 1978; Teatro Olimpicio, 1987) and cinema (The Purple Rose of Cairo, by Woody Allen, 1985; La spirale, by Armand Mattelart and Chris Marker, 1976), theater and opera scenery (Geneva and Brussels, 1981; Venice and Roma, 1989), short films for TV (Italiques TV show, by Marc Gilbert (in French), on the soundtrack of Gott mit uns composed by Ennio Morricone, 1971–1974, opening and closing sections for the French channel Antenne 2, 1975–1984), wooden sculptures, logotypes (Éditions Larousse, Bicentenary of the French Revolution, 1989; Philexfrance, 1989), tapestries (Congress Hall of Monaco, 1989), ships (1990), logos (bird emblem for the Tignes-Albertville Paralympic Winter Games, 1992), church windows (1992), sculptures (La mer, ce grand sculpteur, Knokke, 1997), and even a Palio flag (Siena, 1999).

His artistic value was recognized by several exhibitions organized in the most famous galleries and museums in the world (Musée des Arts Décoratifs, Paris, 1971; Arts Club of Chicago, 1972; Museum Boijmans Van Beuningen, Rotterdam, 1976; Transworld Art, Washington, D.C., 1977; Musée d'Art Moderne de Liège, 1978; Musée Picasso, Antibes, 1984; Correr Museum, Venice, 1985; Metropolitan Museum of Art, New York, 1990; La Pedrera, Barcelona, 1993; Bunkamura Museum, Tokyo, 1995; Olympic Museum, Lausanne, 1996).

He credited Giorgio Soavi for publishing his first posters, which were designed for Olivetti in Milan: "As he has done for many artists, Soavi suggested to me, too, that I invent things that were out of the ordinary for me. This attitude has created such a fertile spirit of invention around him that one wonders if he is not the true author of the works that he has thus encouraged."

Soavi also was largely responsible for the 1975 book Lettres a Giorgio, which reproduces 40 envelopes, each an original watercolor addressed to Soavi—most to his Milan home—and delivered by mail from various international addresses. Folon writes in a brief afterword: "We build in our dreams a monument to the unknown postmen to thank them all for having allowed these images to reach their destination."

In the 1990s, Folon decided to create a foundation in the Solvay Castle, La Hulpe. In 2005, under the direction of Marilena Pasquali, Fabio Mochi organised the exhibition of Jean-Michel Folon in Florence which six years later gave rise to the creation of the permanent Folon exhibition in the Giardino delle Rose (Rose Garden) in Florence. Another piece of television quite famous and remembered is a commercial about methane for SNAM. The soundtrack is Dolorosa by Michel Colombier.

== Personal life ==
Folon settled in the outskirts of Paris in 1955. In 1985, he moved to Monaco.

Milton Glaser describes an incident with Folon in the 1970s: "Last year a group of us were driving at dusk from Paris to Folon's house at Burcy. As we passed the forest of Fountainbleau, Jean-Michel mentioned that we were going to have rabbit for dinner. My wife, Shireley, recoiled and said, "I can't eat rabbit, I have a rabbit at home" (referring to Mr. Hoffman, our dwarf albino). Jean-Michel paused thoughtfully for a moment and said, "O.K., then we can have some nice cheese . . . unless you have a cheese at home."

== Death ==
Jean-Michel Folon died in Monaco on 20 October 2005, at the age of 71. He was buried at the Monaco Cemetery. His two children Catherine and François were both handicapped and died at a young age.

== Book covers ==
- Gros-Câlin, by Romain Gary
- Brave New World, by Aldous Huxley
- Universal Declaration of Human Rights
- Le Buveur de temps, by Philippe Delerm
- Les philosophes et l'amour, by Aude Lancelin

== In popular culture ==
In 1980, the disco singer Sheila mentions him in 'Les sommets blancs de Wolfgang,' on her album Pilote sur les ondes. In 1985, the song 'Comme dans les dessins de Folon', written by Philippe Delerm, on the album "La langue de chez nous," by Yves Duteil. In 2014, the singer Calogero mentions the soundtracks of Ennio Morricone and the flying men of Folon as inspirations. In 2015, Cyril Houplain (in French) mentions Folon as an inspiration to create the visual universe of -M- aka Matthieu Chedid's album Nous deux (Ma mélodie).
