= Uffholtz =

Commune in Grand Est, France

Uffholtz Üffholz
- Commune
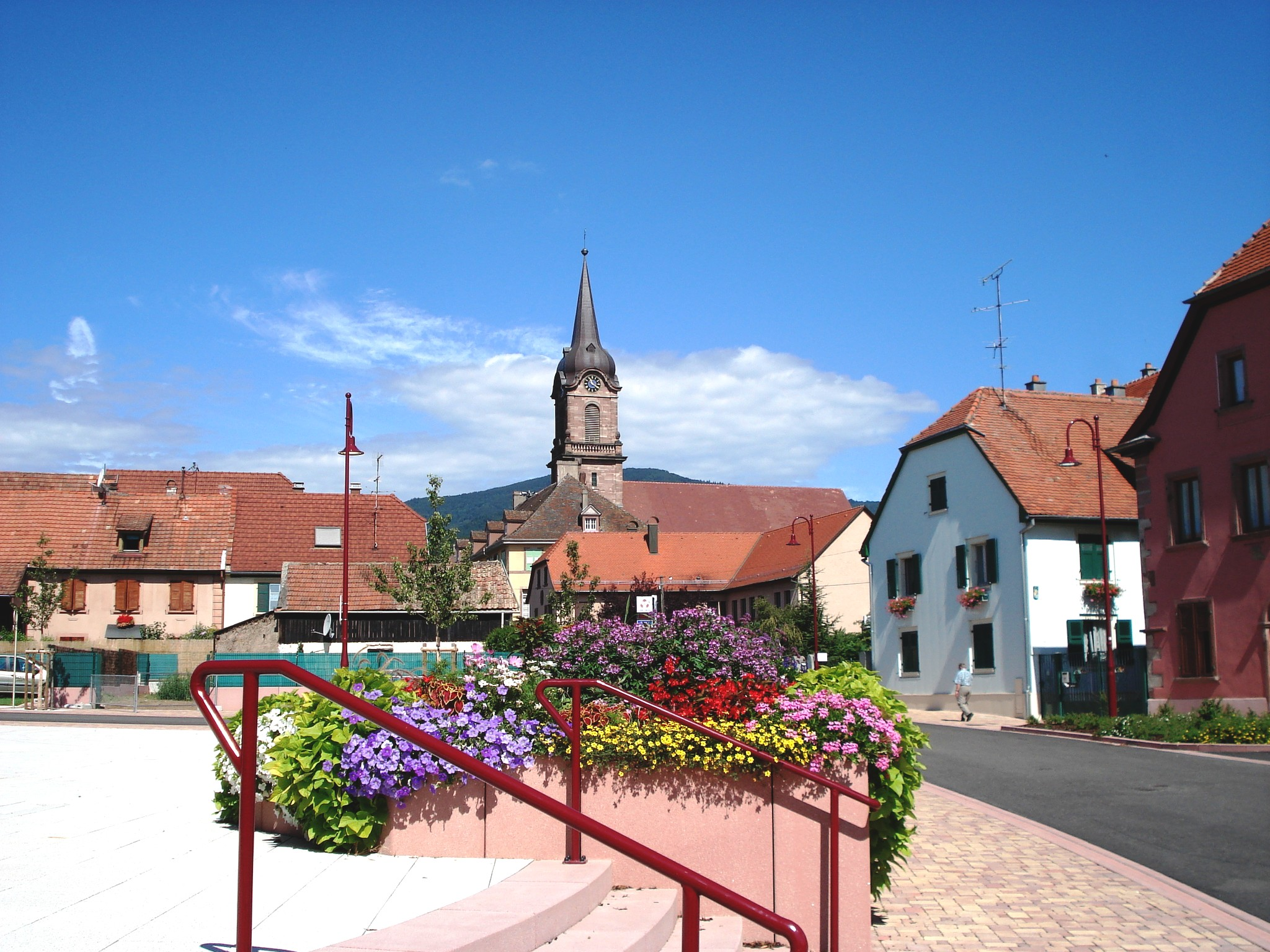
- The centre of Uffholtz

- Coat of arms
- Location of Uffholtz
- Location within France Location within Grand Est
- Coordinates: 47°49′15″N 7°10′47″E
- Country: France
- Region: Grand Est
- Department: Haut-Rhin
- Arrondissement: Thann-Guebwiller
- Canton: Cernay
- Intercommunality: Thann-Cernay

Government
  - Mayor (2020–2026): Rémi Duchene
- Area^{1}: 11.91 km^{2} (4.60 sq mi)
- Elevation: 320 m (1,050 ft)
- Highest elevation: 1,120 m (3,670 ft)
- Lowest elevation: 267 m (876 ft)
- Population (2023): 1,614
  - Density: 135.5/km^{2} (351.0/sq mi)
- Time zone: UTC+01:00 (CET)
  - Summer (DST): UTC+02:00 (CEST)
- INSEE/Postal code: 68342 /68700
- ^{1} French Land Register data, which excludes lakes, ponds, glaciers > 1 km^{2} (0.386 sq mi or 247 acres) and river estuaries.

Uffholtz (Alemannic German: Üffholz; German: Uffholz) is a commune in the Haut-Rhin department in Grand Est in north-eastern France. The organist and composer Aloÿs Claussmann (1850–1926) was born in Uffholtz.

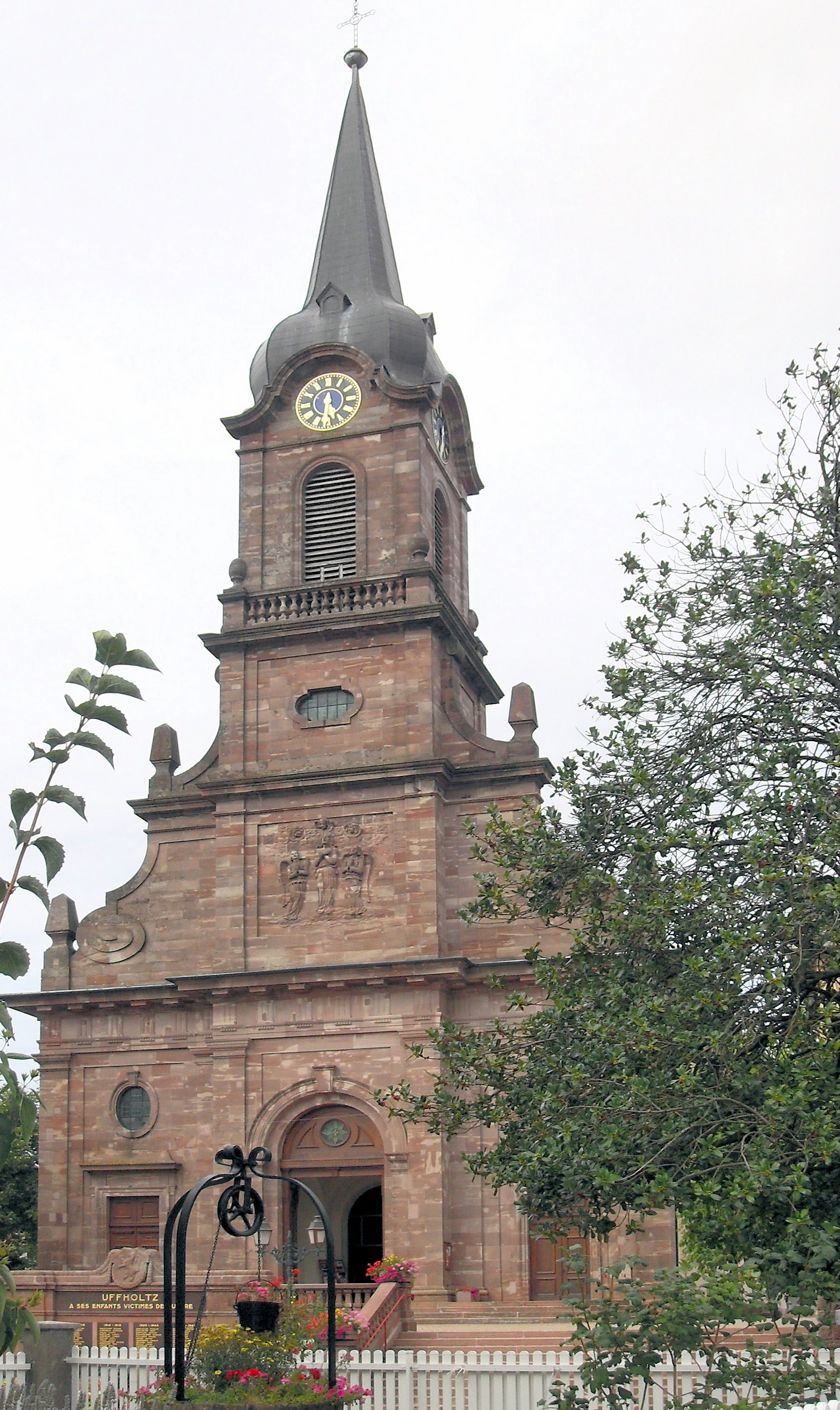
Saint Erasmus Church

== Population ==
Historical population
Year	Pop.	±% p.a.
1968	1,169	—
1975	1,231	+0.74%
1982	1,327	+1.08%
1990	1,303	−0.23%
1999	1,385	+0.68%
2007	1,559	+1.49%
2012	1,580	+0.27%
2017	1,795	+2.58%
2023	1,614	−1.76%
Source: INSEE

== See also ==
- Communes of the Haut-Rhin department
