= Bruno Pinchard =

French philosopher (born 1955)

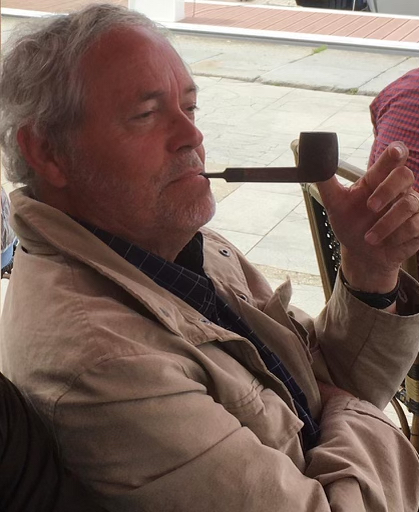
- Born: 15 June 1955 (age 71); Le Havre, Seine-Maritime, France

Education
- Education: Lycée Louis-le-Grand
- Alma mater: École normale supérieure

Philosophical work
- Region: Western philosophy
- Institutions: Centre d'études supérieures de la Renaissance, Université Jean-Moulin – Lyon-III, Centre Jean Pépin (Cnrs-École normale supérieure)

Bruno Pinchard (born 15 June 1955 in Le Havre) is a French writer and scholar, PhD, and professor of philosophy.

== Early life and career ==
Bruno Pinchard was born into a family of musicians. His father is the composer Max Pinchard who gave him a musical education himself.

After studying at the Lycée François Ier (Le Havre), then at Louis-le-Grand, he was admitted to the École normale supérieure (class of 1976).

During these years, he attended courses given by Louis Althusser, Emmanuel Levinas, Jacques Derrida, and Jacques Lacan, and became friends with Pierre Caye and Pierre Lochak.

After receiving his Agrégation in philosophy in 1978, he also became a student at a second École Normale Supérieure in Pisa (1979–1981), where his professor was Eugenio Garin.

However, the decisive encounters were made outside the schools: those of the composer Georges Migot and the mathematician René Thom in France, as well as the musicologist Annibale Gianuario in Italy.

In 1982, he defended a post-graduate thesis at the École des hautes études en sciences sociales under the direction of Louis Marin: L'Orphée moderne, rhétorique et métaphysique du "suono delle parole" dans l'humanisme littéraire et musical du Cinquecento.

After defending his dissertation in 1991, "La Fabbrica della mente, de Cajétan à Vico" under the direction of Pierre Magnard at the University of Paris-IV Sorbonne, he was elected professor at the University of Tours and at the Centre d'études supérieures de la Renaissance (chair of Renaissance philosophy).

Since 2003, Bruno Pinchard has held the Chair of Philosophy of the Renaissance and the Classical Age at the Université Jean-Moulin Lyon-III, where he is director of the École doctorale de philosophie, Rhône-Alpes region (2007–2016).

In 2016, he was elected Dean of the Faculty of Philosophy for a five-year term.

Since 2021, he has continued his work in France at the Centre Jean Pépin (CNRS-ENS Ulm), and has developed his research along two institutional lines: the Société Dantesque de France, of which he is the founder, and Actualités de René Thom.

Moreover, Bruno Pinchard has given lectures abroad: at the Istituto Italiano per gli Studi Filosofici in Naples, and at Italian research centres (Catania, Bologna, Trento). He has presented works on Descartes at the University of Chicago and on Rabelais at the University of North Carolina at Chapel Hill. He has been invited to universities in Quebec (Laval and UM) and Romania. He has travelled twice to Israel to present his work on Rabelais and the Jewish tradition. He also works with the Université Libre de Belgique. In 2008, he taught at Japanese universities (Nihon, Waseda, Todai, Kwansei-Gakuin).He has regularly visited China, especially the Sun-Yat-sen University in Canton.

China constitutes a centre of interest for Pinchard; in this regard, he will follow the footsteps of the poet Saint-John Perse, the sinologist Marcel Granet, and the writer André Malraux, so as to seek wisdom in the East.

Starting from December 2025, he will eventually teach during a semester at the Beijing Normal University (BNU) in Beijing. The teachings should focus on the western tradition, Humanism and the works of Karl Marx. He may work so as to foster a spiritual rebirth of the East and to reunite through thinking the Occident and the Orient.

His recent studies concern mostly his translations and commentaries of Dante Alighieri. He will, in the near future, publish a new edition of the Inferno (Dante).

== Work ==
Bruno Pinchard seeks in philosophy to break with the "deconstruction" which reigned over his intellectual generation and calls for a "Metamorphosis of the philosophia perennis " (the "eternal philosophy"), that is to say, for the conditions of a spiritual renaissance through a "metaphysic of destruction" in a context of increased destruction. This metaphysic of destruction leads him to reconstruct metaphysics in an "entwined" architecture of the mind.

His study on the Fabbrica della mente, "architecture of the mind" (an expression borrowed from Tasso), published in 1992 under the title La Raison dédoublée, focuses historically on the Italian Renaissance, of which he makes the exemplary episode of a renewal of philosophy. Based on the examination of this pivotal period, between the Middle Ages and modern times, he posits that the architecture of the mind capable of carrying a civilization is built from the "splitting" of its principle.

The thought of the Renaissance was split between scholasticism and modernity (through the question of analogy), between paganism and Christianity (with the return of Platonism), between land and sea (with the great discoveries). From these historical observations, Bruno Pinchard's work consists in giving a conceptual meaning to the dynamics of "splitting". For Pinchard, it is only on the basis of splitting that thought achieves its theoretical and practical ends. As soon as the mind splits, human intelligence becomes fertile. Pinchard thus opposes the critical power of duality to the reductions to a constrained unity which, in his eyes, characterise ideologies.

According to Pinchard, the real power of thought is to liberate the irrepressible split that resides in everything that claims to be a unity. Pinchard manages to contain the destructive risk by finding in humanist myths a measure capable of imposing itself on the dividing power of intelligence. Through this culture of reflected myth, Pinchard's thought is a humanism.

In the face of oppositions that now seem irreconcilable between profane and sacred, tradition and modernity, progress and decadence or globalisation and territorialisation, we find at work according to Pinchard federating myths, which are the foundations of a human community. In fact, these myths do not hinder the deepening of the splits at the basis of historical life. They constitute only the substantial bottom of it. Pinchard finds universal expressions of these myths, in particular in Rabelais and in Dante: the giants of the origin and the cult of the Mediterranean goddesses. By the same means, he defends ontology against the anti-substantialist bias of contemporary philosophy, in particular the phenomenological current, any substance becoming for him a mythical centre, which he names after René Thom, a "well of potential ".

Bruno Pinchard has maintained a constant dialogue with the mathematical work of René Thom. He has sought in the geometry of catastrophes (topological folds of space) the deep form of these organising myths. Under the impulse of René Thom, his philosophy became an "occasionalism" which makes of every event an occasion actualizing the pure form of a myth. He found an extension of this point of view in the idea of Capital according to Marx, which could be called a "mythological occasionalism ".

To sum up, according to Pinchard, splitting is the oldest mark of humanity, which knows itself to be exposed to becoming and death, that of a knowledge confronted with its share of ignorance and the duality of its engendering. To be split is to be initiated into the secret of the world and to find one's place in the history of humanisation.

Thus, according to Bruno Pinchard, splitting is established as a method to be implemented in the field of human sciences as in any effort to interpret the testimonies of the past. For this author, it is ultimately a question of responding to the challenge posed by the idea of the end of metaphysics.

== Dante Alighieri Society of France ==
Bruno Pinchard founded the Société Dantesque de France (SDdF) in January 2016 and was elected its president. In his founding letter, he invites several researchers and philosophers to reactivate the initiative of Professor Laurencin and Maurice Mignon from before the Second World War. Based on the new historical studies carried out on the image and work of Dante Alighieri, the SDdF intends to participate in the network of Dante societies throughout the world and work on the transmission of the poet's thought. The management team and the scientific committee of the society bring together many eminent Italianists, philosophers, young doctoral students and several academics.

== Actuality of René Thom ==
Bruno Pinchard contributes to the ongoing research on René Thom's work organised, since 2018, by Jean-Jacques Szczeciniarz, Jean Petitot, Isabel Marcos and Clément Morier: Actualités de René Thom. Bruno Pinchard, together with an artist, Thibaud Bernard-Helis, leads a working group on morphological neo-aristotelianism in his seminar on Dante at the École normale supérieure (Paris)

== Freemasonry ==
A member of the Grande Loge nationale française (GLNF), he is Worshipful Master of the Villard de Honnecourt research lodge. In April 2015, he gave a public lecture on the theme of "Femininity and initiation" in the premises of the obedience. In May 2015, he was a lecturer for the GLNF in the company of the historian Yves Hivert-Messeca for the Grand Orient de France during the "Lafayette meetings", the first meeting in history between the two obediences representing the two main currents of Freemasonry. He was also co-editor of the Masonic journal Les Cahiers Villard de Honnecourt. On the occasion of the publication of his book Philosophie de l'initiation in 2016, he mentioned his membership of Freemasonry. In November 2016, during the Salon maçonnique du livre de Paris, this book received the literary prize in the philosophy and society category from the Institut maçonnique de France.

== Bibliography ==
- Métaphysique et sémantique. Autour de Cajétan, Paris, Librairie philosophique, Vrin, 1987.
- Savonarole. La Fonction de la poésie, précédé de «Le nœud de la colère », Lausanne, L'Âge d'Homme, 1989.
- Pierre Magnard, Olivier Boulnois, Bruno Pinchard et Jean-Luc Solère, La demeure de l'être. Autour d'un anonyme. Étude et traduction du Liber de Causis, Paris, Vrin, 1990.
- La Raison dédoublée. La Fabbrica della mente, suivi de «La transcendance démembrée» par René Thom, Paris, Aubier, 1992
- (dir.), Rationalisme analogique et humanisme théologique, la culture de Thomas de Vio, Il Gaetano, Actes du Colloque de Naples réunis par Bruno Pinchard et Saverio Ricci, Naples, Vivarium, 1993.
- Vico. De l'antique sagesse de l'Italie, Paris, Flammarion, «GF», 1993.
- (dir.), «Fine follie» ou la catastrophe humaniste, Paris, Champion, 1995.
- Le Bûcher de Béatrice, essai sur Dante, Paris, Aubier, 1996.
- Une juste plainte, une juste prière: Ariane et Orphée aux origines du chant orphique de Claudio Monteverdi; Introduction à la connaissance du "Parlar cantando" et du chant humaniste à Annibale Gianuario, Fondazione Centro Studi Rinascimento Musicale, Fiesole, 1997.
- (dir.), La légèreté de l'être, études sur Malebranche, Paris, Vrin, 1998.
- (dir.), Pour Dante : I. Dante et l'Apocalypse. II. Lectures humanistes de Dante, Paris, Honoré Champion-CESR, 2001.
- Méditations mythologiques, Paris, Les Empêcheurs de penser en rond, Le Seuil, 2002. (Note: Cet ouvrage est disponible en roumain : Meditatii mito-logice, traduction de Dorin Ciontescu-Samfireag, préface et traduction trad. Ionel Buse, Édition Dacia, Cluj Napoca, 2010. En effet, le roumain : Meditatii mito-logice signifie "Méditations mytho-logiques". Voir la page de ce livre à la bibliothèque Fundația Noua Europă.)
- Un Dieu pour la ville, une âme dans la ville, cours d'Agrégation de philosophie sur saint Augustin, CNED, 2004.
- (dir.), Heidegger et la question de l'humanisme: faits, concepts, débats, Paris, PUF, 2005.
- (dir.), en collaboration avec Yves-Charles Zarka, Y a-t-il une histoire de la métaphysique? Paris, PUF, 2005.
- Éducation, transmission, rénovation à la Renaissance, textes sur la Renaissance réunis par Bruno Pinchard et Pierre Servet, ouverture de Jacqueline de Romilly, Cahiers du Gadges, No. 4, Diffusion Libraire Droz, Genève, 2006.
- Recherches métaphysiques. Philosophie française contemporaine (Leçons données dans les universités japonaises, octobre 2008), édition bilingue, Tokyo, Nihon University press, 2009.
- Philosophie à outrance, cinq essais de métaphysique contemporaine, Bruxelles, EME, 2010.
- Rovesciamenti e rotazioni, Due saggi di metafisica contemporanea, a cura di Luigi Francesco Clemente, Nuovi Orizzonti, San Benedetto del Tronto, 2011
- Métaphysique de la destruction, Bibliothèque philosophique de Louvain No. 86, Peeters-Vrin, 2012.
- Marx à rebours, Paris, Kimé, 2014.
- Écrits sur la Raison classique, Paris, Kimé, 2015.
- Philosophie de l'initiation, Paris, Dervy, 2016.
- Hespérie; contribution virgilienne à une politique occidentale, Paris, Kimé, 2018.
- Poeta Sitiens : Rabelais et la philosophie, en collaboration avec Yoann Dumel, Paris, Kimé, 2021.
- Dante, Le Banquet, traduction et édition critique, Paris, Garnier, 2023.
- Dante, La Vie neuve, traduction et édition critique, Paris, Garnier, 2024.

== Distinctions ==
- Chevalier de l'ordre des Palmes académiques, 2007.

In 2025, he is awarded the Mabillon Prize of the French Academy.

== See also ==
- Divine Comedy
