= Giardino delle Rose =

Garden park in Florence, Tuscany, Italy

Coordinates: 43°45′47″N 11°15′46″E

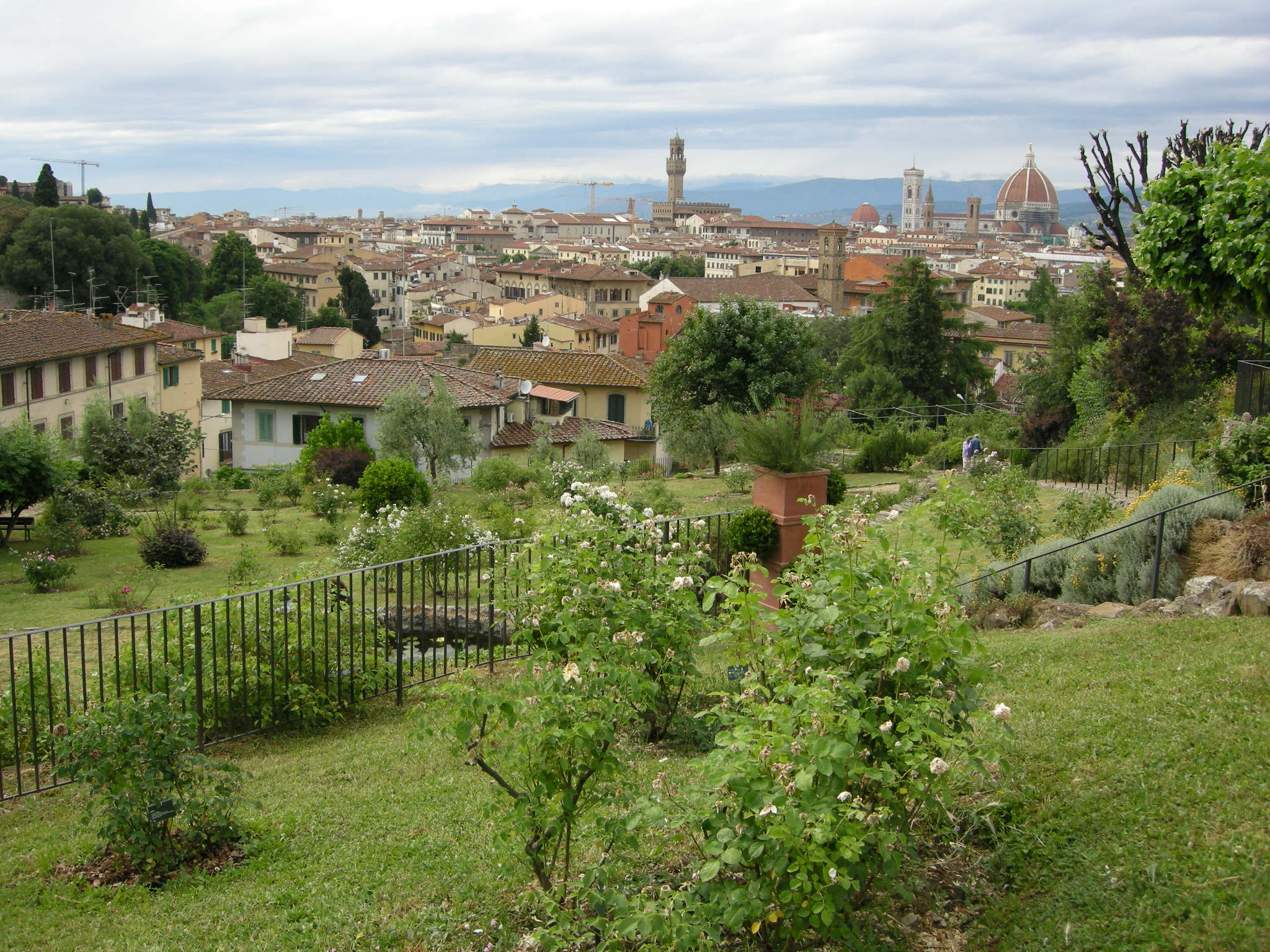
The Rose Garden, with view of the city

Il Giardino delle Rose (The Rose Garden) is a garden park in the Oltrarno district of Florence, in Tuscany, Italy. It is located below the Piazzale Michelangelo and offers a commanding view of the city.

Once open to the public for only a brief period in spring, the garden is now open daily (except for Christmas and New Year's Day) from 9 am until sunset

== History ==
The Rose Garden was created by the Florentine architect Giuseppe Poggi in 1865, following a commission by the municipality of Florence to develop the left bank of the Arno River, when the capital of Italy was moved from Turin to Florence that year. His contributions include both the Pialeas Michelangelo and the garden. It has an area of about 1 ha and is terraced. Once part of the property of the Oratorian Fathers, the Podere San Francesco (San Francesco farm), the area was transformed into a garden by Attilio Pucci, who started a collection of roses. In 1895, the garden was opened for the first time to the public during the Arts and Flowers Festival, which was held every May.

In 1998, the garden gained a Japanese Shorai oasis, donated by Yasuo Kitayama and the Kōdai-ji Zen temple by the Florence's twin city of Kyoto. Since September 2011 the garden has hosted twelve sculptures by the Belgian artist Jean-Michel Folon, donated by his widow to the municipality of Florence. The sculptures are: Partir (2005), Un oiseau (1993), Chat-oiseau (1994), Chat (1996), Vingt-cinquième pensée (2001), Méditerranée (2001), Panthère (2003), Walking (2003), Je me souviens (2003), Partir (2005) and L’envol (2005).

== Location and access ==
The garden is situated on the southern slopes of the Monte alle Croci overlooking the river Arno and the central historic district of Florence on its north bank. It is bounded to the south west by the pedestrian Scalea del Monte alle Croci from which it is accessed. A second pedestrian access is from the Viale Giuseppe Poggi in the eastern end of the upper garden. Vehicular access is also from this road but further down the hill. It forms part of a cluster of major attractions to the south east of the city on the slopes of Monte alle Croci which also include the Giardino dell'Iris, Piazzale Michelangelo and the churches of San Salvatore al Monte and San Miniato al Monte. The Piazzale Michelangelo can be accessed from the top garden exit by crossing the Viale Giuseppe Poggi and walking up the ramp on the opposite side.

Originally open only in May, it is now open all year round from 9am to sunset (8pm May–September, 6pm October, March and April, and 5pm November–February) except Christmas Day and New Year's Day. The best time to visit the garden to enjoy its beauty is in the spring when the roses are at their best.

== See also ==
- List of botanical gardens in Italy

== Bibliography ==
- Rinaldi, Niccolò (2012). "Rose Garden". Secret Florence. trans. Jeremy Scott (2 ed.). Versailles: JonGlez. p. 286. ISBN 9782361950446.
- "Giardino delle Rose". Diladdarno: Firenze oltre il fiume.
- Montanari, Laura (29 September 2011). "Nel giardino delle visioni l'ultimo desiderio di Folon". Repubblica (in Italian).
