= Mocchi =

Mocchi may refer to:

- Mocchi (singer) (born 1990), Uruguayan singer and composer
- Kaori Mochida (born 1978), Japanese singer
- Walter Mocchi (1871–1955), Italian politician and impresario, former owner of the Teatro dell'Opera di Roma
- Mocchi, or Motoharu Iwadera (born 1981), member of Japanese band Sakanaction

== See also ==
- Mochi (disambiguation)
