= Aubert Lemeland =

French composer (1932–2010)

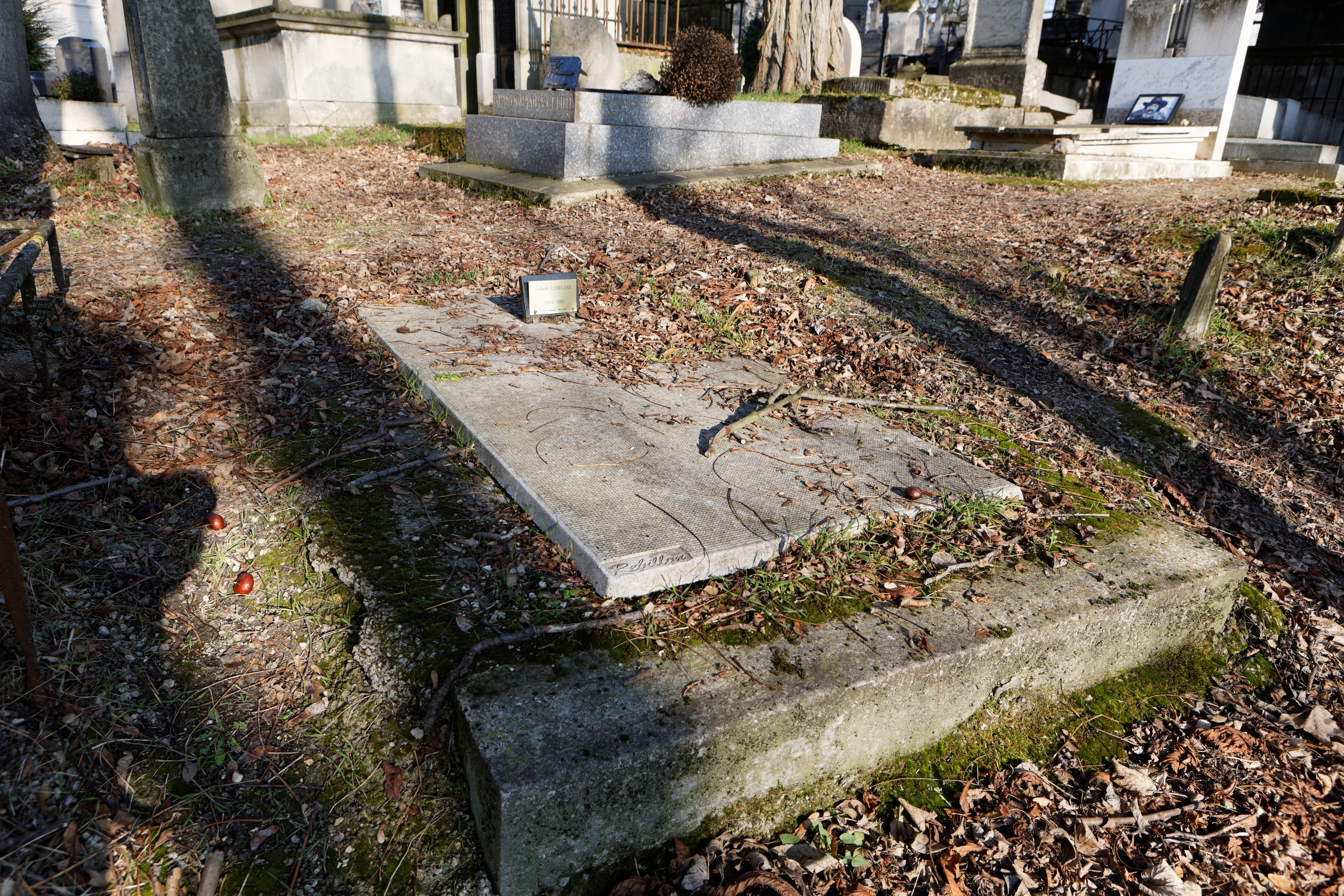
Grave at Père Lachaise Cemetery

Aubert Lemeland (19 December 1932 – 15 November 2010) was a French composer.

== Life ==
Born in La Haye-du-Puits, after his studies in piano and cello classes in Cherbourg, then in Paris - where he moved in 1948 - and interrupted by a long illness, Lemeland produced his first works in the mid-1960s. Lemeland died in Paris at the age of 77. He is buried at Père Lachaise Cemetery (22nd division).

== Works ==
His latest creations (2008/2010), include the 11th symphony, by the Rouen Philharmonic Orchestra, conducted by Oswald Sallaberger, two tales by Grimm by the soloists of the Ensemble Orchestral de Paris (now Orchestre de chambre de Paris), Épitaphe française, concerto pour orgue, orchestre à cordes et trompette, by Hervé Désarbre, Eric Planté and the French Republican Guard Band, conducted by Sébastien Billiard.

== Selected recordings ==
- Laure, ou La lettre au cachet rouge Monika Brändle (soprano), Richard Williams (tenor), Claudio Danuser (baritone), Laurence Albert (bass) Staatsorchester Rheinische Philharmonie, Marc Tardue 2003 Skarbo 45 minutes

== Bibliography ==
- Last Letters from Stalingrad. Paris: L'Harmattan. 2009. p. 86. ISBN 978-2-296-09831-2.
