= Guy Morançon =

French composer and organist (1927–2025)

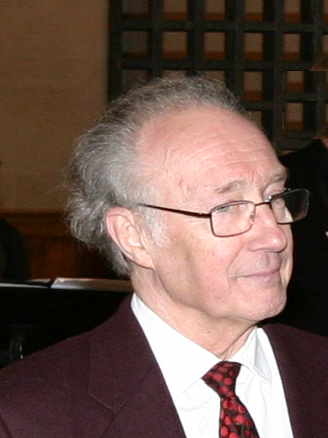
- Morançon in 2007
- Born: 5 December 1927; Marseille, France
- Died: 27 November 2025 (aged 97)
- Education: Conservatoire de Paris
- Occupations: Composer; Organist; Conductor
- Organizations: Basilica of Notre-Dame-des-Victoires, Paris
- Awards: Ordre des Arts et Lettres

Guy Morançon (5 December 1927 – 25 November 2025) was a French composer and organist. He was titular organist of Notre-Dame-des-Victoires in Paris, founder and conductor of the Chœurs Jean-Baptiste Lully, director of the Conservatoire Nadia et Lili Boulanger from 1982 to 1991, and inspector of music for the City of Paris. He is remembered for the first recording of Mendelssohn's complete organ works in 1970 at the Cavaillé-Coll organ of Saint-Ouen de Rouen. Olivier Messiaen once said that he was "a true musician".

== Life and career ==
Born in Marseille on 5 December 1927, Morançon studied at the Marseille conservatory and the Accademia Musicale Chigiana. He studied further at the Conservatoire de Paris — organ with Alexandre Eugène Cellier and Marcel Dupré, orchestral conducting with Louis Fourestier and Carl Schuricht, and Olivier Messiaen in composition.

He became titular organist of the Basilica of Notre-Dame-des-Victoires, Paris. In 1962, he founded the Chœurs Jean-Baptiste Lully, performing a broad range of sacred music repertoire, from Orlando di Lasso to Messiaen.

As a composer, he created works in many genres, including orchestral works, masses, organ pieces and Christmas music, with some of them commissioned by the State.

Morançon was director of the Conservatoire Nadia et Lili Boulanger from 1982 to 1991. He was inspector and inspector of music for the Ville de Paris.<! -- He presided over the "Musique au Val-de-Grâce" association. -->

Morançon recorded extensively, especially organ works. In 1970, Morançon was the first to record Mendelssohn's complete organ works, playing the Cavaillé-Coll organ of Saint-Ouen de Rouen for Iramac, which became a reference recording. He also recorded for Arion, Inédits-ORTF, Elyon, Jade, Mandala, and Pathé-Marconi/EMI.

He was honoured as a chevalier of the Ordre des Arts et Lettres in 2002, and received a silver medal from the city of Paris.

Morançon died on 25 November 2025, at the age of 97.

== Compositions ==
Among the 82 compositions listed by the French National Library are:

- Dix noëls de Provence, for organ
- Quatre autres noëls de Provence for organ
- Three pieces for grand organ
- Three studies for string orchestra, after Paolo Uccello
- Sirventès, for guitar
- 1974 Musique pour orgue et cordes, for organ and strings
- Fantasy on a theme by Heinrich Schütz, for lute and eight choirs
- 1977 Messe de Verlaine, for women's choir (1 to 4 parts) and three instruments: piano, percussion and ondes Martenot
- 1989: Enneagone, for reed trio (oboe, clarinet, bassoon) and string orchestra
- Différenciations, for four bass trombones
- Divertissement, for flute, oboe, cello and harpsichord
- Divertissement, version for flute, clarinet, violin, cello and harpsichord
- Sept pastorales, for wind quintet
- Salicornes, for viola and piano
- Prélude à l'Ile mystérieuse, in tribute to Jules Verne, for ten stringed instruments
- Le page tremblant, ballade to lyrics by Paul Fort, for choir a cappella
- String Quartet
- Linéaires, for mixed choir, on lyrics by Albert Ginet
- Le navire qui chante dans l'arbre, for choir, on lyrics by Fort

== Recordings ==
Recordings with Morançon include:

- 1970 Complete Organ Work of Mendelssohn, Morançon at St. Ouen, Rouen, Iramac 1970.
- 1972 Musiques nuptiales et marches funèbres, Morançon at St. Ouen, Rouen, EMI
- 1972 Les Grandes Toccatas, Morançon at St. Ouen, Rouen, EMI
- 1980 Mozart, works for organ (sonata, chorale, march, variations), Morançon at N.-D. des Victoires, Mandala
- 1982 La messe du Verlaines by Morançon, Maitrise G. Fauré, T. Farré-Fizio, SOS
- 1983 Messe des bergers de Provence by Morançon, Baladins de la Chanson choir, conducted by Henri Bouteille at Les Carmes, Marseille, Elyon
- 1992 Orgues de Paris including Claude Balbastre's La Marche des Marseillais, Morançon at N.-D. des Victoires, Erato
- 1997 Noëls de Provence by Morançon, organist Rupert Gough, Regent
- 1998 Trois Noëls de Provence, Quatre Noëls de Saboly by Morançon, played by the composer at N.-D. des Victoires, Mandala
- 2000 Méditations pour orgue et clarinette by Schubert, Schumann, Rabaud, Fauré and Morançon, Morançon and clarinetist Guy Deplus at N.-D. des Victoires, Jade
- 2003 Enneagone for oboe, clarinet, bassoon and string orchestra, Seven Pastorals for wind quintet, Three studies for string orchestra, Le Chant du Monde
- 2003: Musique pour orgue et cordes by Morançon, organist Hervé Désarbre on the Cavaillé-Coll organ of the église du Val-de-Grâce, and the Ensemble Stringendo conducted by Jean Thorel, Mandala
