= Solvay Castle =

Château in Walloon Brabant, Belgium

- Château de La Hulpe
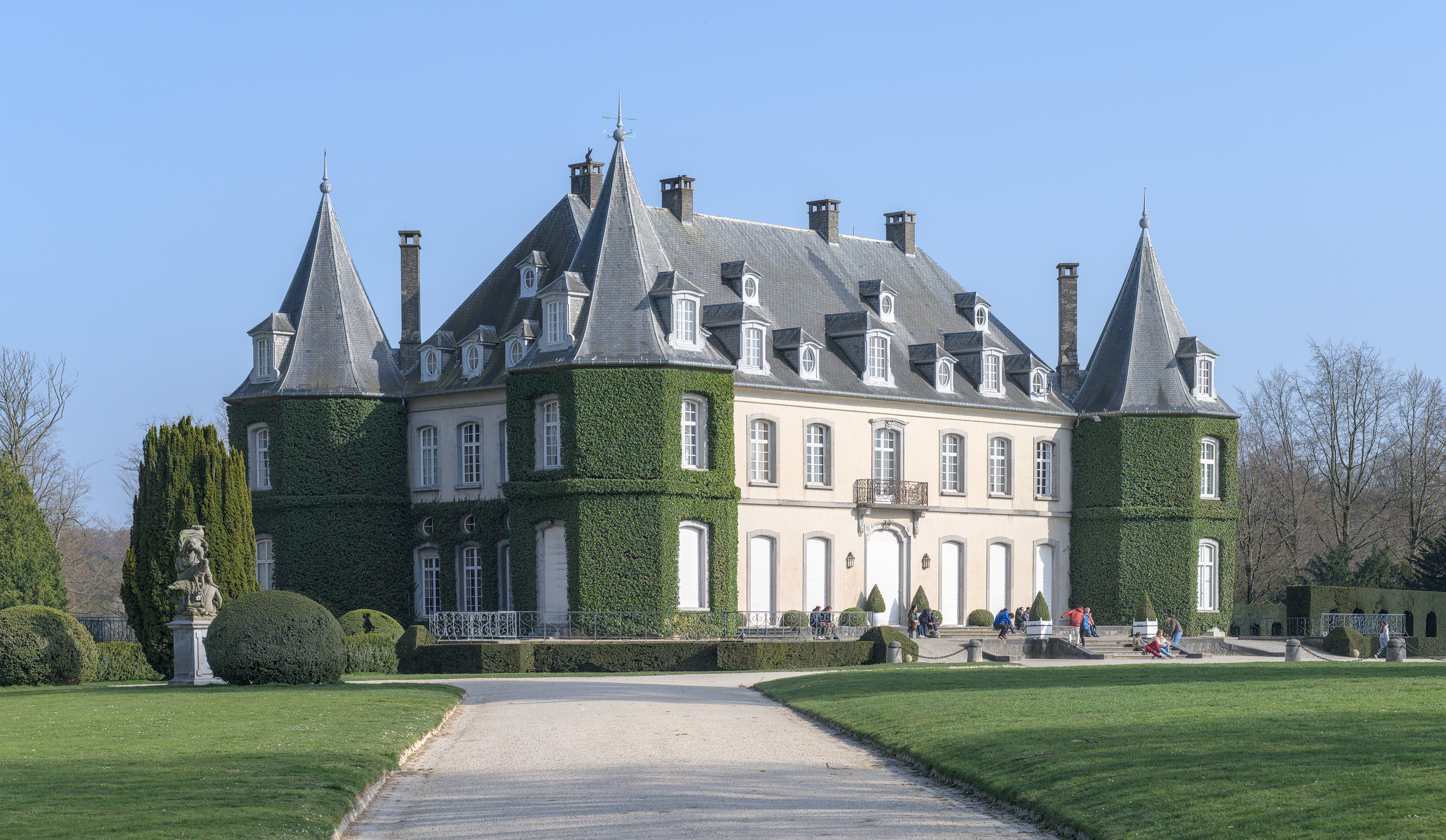

- Location in Belgium
- Alternative names: Château Solvay

General information
- Architectural style: Flemish neo-renaissance architecture
- Location: La Hulpe, Walloon Brabant, Belgium
- Coordinates: 50°44′03″N 4°27′37″E
- Construction started: 1838
- Completed: 1842

Design and construction
- Architects: Jean-Jacques Arveuf-Fransquin; François Coppens

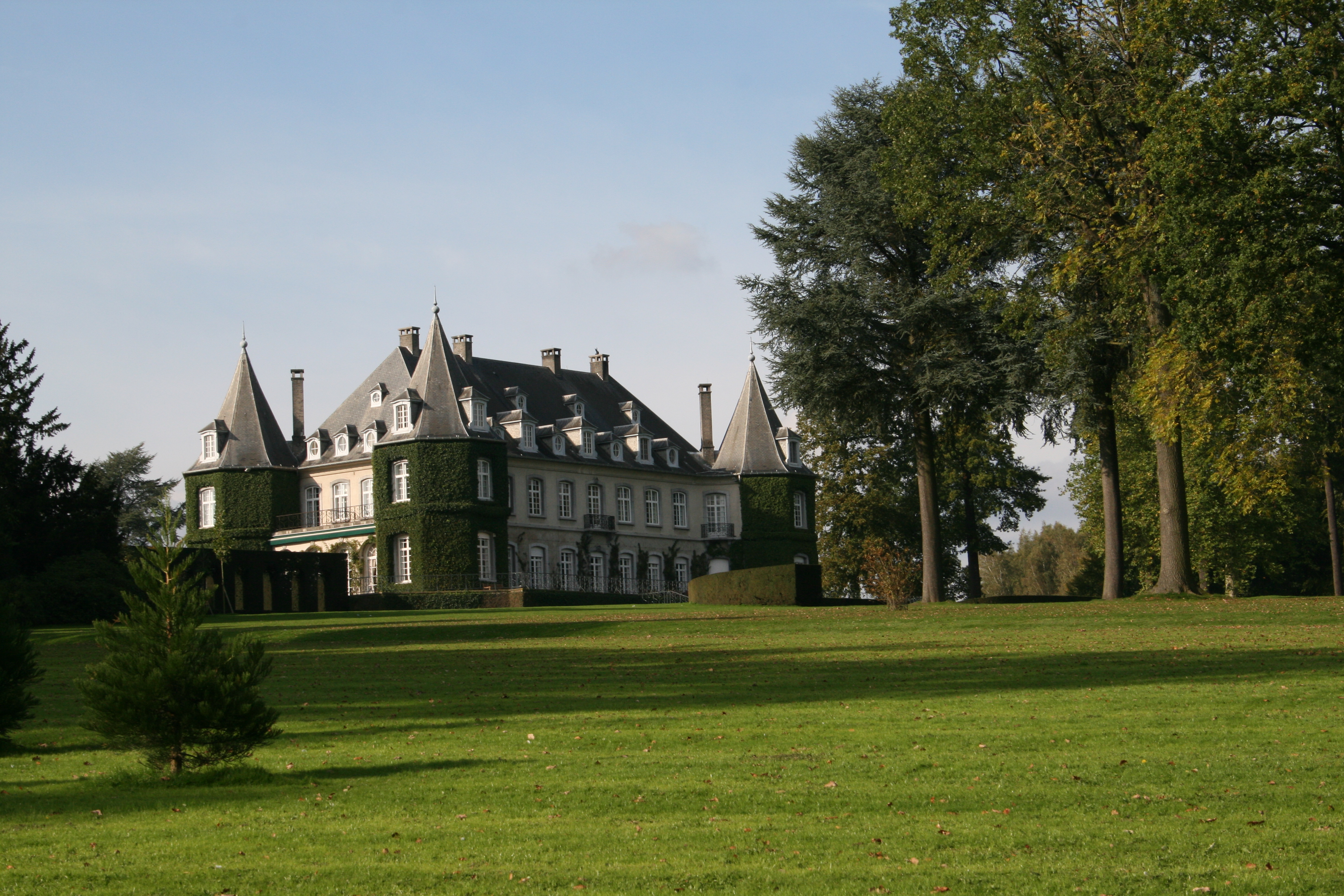
South East elevation

Solvay Castle (French: Château Solvay, also called Château de La Hulpe) is a château located in Wallonia in the municipality of La Hulpe, Walloon Brabant, Belgium.

Completed for the Marquis Maximilien de Béthune as an imposing manor house on the outskirts of Brussels in the 1840s, the castle stands on a hill overlooking a lake set in a park with mature trees covering more than 220 hectares. In 1893, the estate was purchased by the rich industrialist Ernest Solvay, who renovated the park and extensively remodeled the castle from its initial Flemish neo-Renaissance theme to a more elegant look with a French formal garden.

The remainder of the farm was designed in a charming English theme, with rhododendrons, azaleas and forest of a number of species, including huge redwoods and oak trees. A broad lake was built with planned alleyways and vantage points providing a views of the forests. The entire property was given to the Regional Government of Wallonia in 1968 on the basis that it should be used for educational purposes.

There are three five kilometers of walks on the property.

After the donation of the property to the government, the government allowed the Belgian artist Jean-Michel Folon to open a museum in the park in 2000. After the artist died in 2005 it became the Fondation Folon. Inside the park is a non-profit organization, an equestrian center specialized in the relation between disabled persons and horses. Different events have been organized throughout the year in the park. As an example, in August 2019 the Supertramp musician Roger Hodgson made a concert in the park to celebrate 40 years of the Supertramp album, Breakfast in America.

== See also ==
- List of castles in Belgium
