= François Coppens =

Belgian architect (1799–1873)

- Born: Jean-François Coppens; 1799; Brussels, Département de la Dyle, Southern Netherlands, French Republic
- Died: 1873 (aged 73–74); Paris, France
- Occupation: Architect
- Notable work: Brussels-North railway station
- Relatives: Eugène Coppens (son)
- Awards: Order of Leopold

François Coppens (1799 – 1873) was a Belgian architect.

== Biography ==
Jean-François Coppens was born in Brussels, Département de la Dyle, Southern Netherlands, French Republic (now Belgium) in 1799.

On October 30, 1835, Coppens' company Société des Charbonnages et hauts-fourneaux d'Ougrée (English: Coal and blast furnace company of Ougree) was approved by royal decree of King Leopold I. By 1839, François Coppens was director of the Belgian company, residing in Brussels, carrying 1670 shares. In Brussels, the architect resided on Boulevard du Jardin botanique.

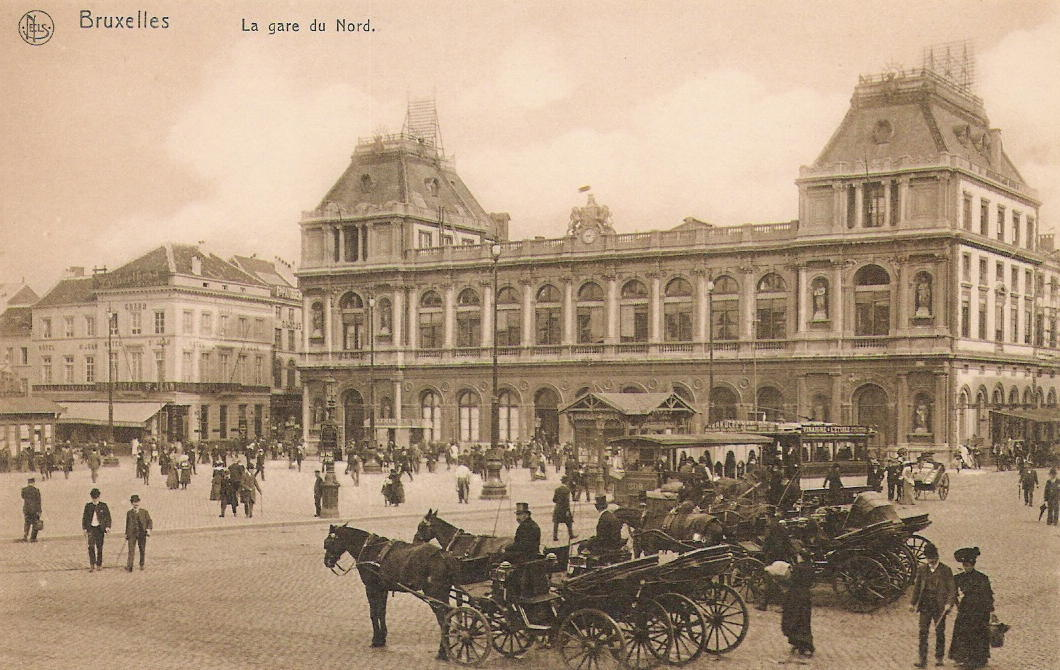
Brussels-North railway station, c. 1910

On September 27, 1841, he was named honorary architect of the railway for the part he took in the formation of the project for the North station in Brussels. On November 8, 1841, François Coppens, was appointed knight of the Order of Leopold.

The project of the Solvay Castle in Walloon Brabant, involving Coppens and French architect Jean-Jacques Nicolas Arveuf-Fransquin, was finished in 1842. In 1847, he built a new Castle of Petegem that was commissioned by Baron Auguste Pycke de Peteghem.

In 1851, he was involved in the Exhibition of the Works of Industry of All Nations, also known as the Great Exhibition in London. He served as a jury member tasked with judging the class of "Decorative furniture and upholstery, including paper-hangings, papier-mâché, and japanned goods.

He was involved in a limited partnership Coppens alné et compagnie which dissolved in 1860, and was replaced by a public company established by Coppens, Charles de Brouckère and Emmanuel Jacques Pyn to operate steam navigation between Ghent and Antwerp. The new company was constituted with a capital of 680,000 francs.

During the 1870s, he was the director of the Quenast Porphyry Quarries Company, which operated the Quenast quarry, with his son Eugène taking over after his death.

== Death ==
François Coppens died in 1873 in Paris, France.
