= Ugo Mochi =

Illustrator, sculptor and designer

Ugo Mochi (pronounced 'Mokey'; 1889–1977) was a 20th-century illustrator, sculptor and designer whose artistic abilities working with the silhouette earned him worldwide notoriety as the greatest living exponent of 'Shadows in Outline'. "He took the idea of the silhouette in new and original directions, beyond the arena of the simple profile. His illustrations adorned the pages of Women’s Home Companion, Collier’s, and American. He sold works to the Duke and Duchess of York, Windsor Castle, and ex-King Manuel of Portugal. Mochi is represented in public and private collections including The Metropolitan Museum of Art in New York and the Berlin Museum of Natural History." (from unpublished book by David Alexander, The Illustrated History of 20th Century Silhouettes and Guide to Collectibles).

He was famous as an animal silhouettist. His most impressive accomplishment was the series of 14 panels created for the American Museum of Natural History. There is a website dedicated to his life and work.

== Biography ==
Mochi was born on 11 March 1889 in Florence, Italy. At a young age he began to display an interest in animals which he displayed through various mediums of art. At age 6 he first began to cut out his figures from simple white paper, using matchboxes and toothpicks to build miniature wagons pulled by cardboard horses he had drawn and cut out himself. At age 8 he took lessons from a Florentine painter; when he was ten, he enrolled in Florence's Fine Arts Academy, where he studied sculpting, anatomy, and drawing.

After a series of tragic events in his life – his father and his mother died within a few months from each other, between 1903 and 1904 – Mochi moved to Milan and later, in 1909, to Germany. In those years, he illustrated books, postcards, and decor items. He often went to the Berlin zoo and portrayed animals with his cutouts, but also sang at cafés and beer taverns. In the 1920s, he continued to pursue his passion for singing and, once back in Italy, performed under the stage name "Signore Fiorentino". Meanwhile, his paper silhouettes gained growing success, and he continued to produce them for clients as important as noted Italian brands Campari and Pirelli.

In 1928, Mochi and his wife – an opera singer – moved to the United States and settled in New Rochelle, New York, where he lived for the rest of his life. During the Second World War, in 1941–1943, he created the Ladies of the White House series, commissioned by World Book Encyclopedia. Portraits ranged from Martha Washington to Eleanor Roosevelt, whom he met after completing the project.

His animals are some of his major works. New York's American Museum of Natural History currently has fourteen huge panels on display showcasing his dinosaurs, penguins, and majestic rainforest creatures. In the 1970s, still in the United States, he published a series of books in collaboration with Dorcas MacClintock (who wrote the copy), including "A Natural History of Giraffes" (1973) and "A Natural History of Zebras" (1976).

The "Poet of Shadows" – as he became known in the United States – died at the age of eighty-eight in New Rochelle (New York).

== Books published ==
- "African Images", 1984
- "Horses as I See Them", 1980
- "Hoofed Mammals of the World", 1971
- "A Natural History of Giraffes" (text by Dorcas MacClintock), 1973
- "A Natural History of Zebras" (text by Dorcas MacClintock), 1976
