= Max Pinchard =

French composer and musicologist

Max Pinchard (21 July 1928 in Le Havre – 12 December 2009 in Grand-Couronne) was a 20th-century French composer and musicologist.

== Biography ==
In addition to his activities as composer, Max Pinchard was also:

- Teacher at Lycée François Ier du Havre as well as at the Rouen conservatory;
- Director of the music conservatories at Saint-Étienne-du-Rouvray, Grand-Couronne and Petit-Couronne;
- Music critic for the magazines Diapason, Revue du son, for more than twenty years;
- Author of several books;
- Conductor.

He was a member of the Académie des sciences, belles-lettres et arts de Rouen.

Max Pinchard was philosopher Bruno Pinchard's father.

== Works ==
=== Symphonic orchestra ===
- Arche forte, Symphonic Movement No. 3
- Cheminement, Sinfonietta
- La Forêt, le Fleuve, la Ville, Triptyque Symphonique
- La Mort du Clown for orchestra
- Mystérieux et Intense, A Variation on a Theme by Debussy for orchestra (1979)
- Quadruple mouvement symphonique n°1
- Suite noble
- Suite Symphonique d'après l'oratorio Sainte unité de Trois.

=== Chamber orchestra ===
- Aux fêtes de la pluie for cello and chamber orchestra
- Chorals polyphoniques I et II
- De nuage et de vent Sinfonia for string orchestra
- Double Concerto for viola, cello and string orchestra (1969)
- Joyeusement Vôtre 5 instantanés for string orchestra
- L'Autre Versant du Jour, Symphonic Movement No. 2
- Symphonie du Verseau, Symphony for string orchestra
- Terre d'ombre, Choral for string orchestra

=== Chamber music ===
- Grand ciel voilé, 2 Pieces for viola and piano (1980)
- L'eau des ombres, 2 Pieces for violin and viola (1976)
- Prélude et petite danse for viola and cello (1966)

== Publications ==
- 1957: Introduction à l'Art Musical (in French). Paris: Éditions Ouvrières. p. 271. OCLC 11387197.
- 1959: Connaissance de Georges Migot, Musicien Français, Éditions Ouvrières
- 1963: Ma Discothèque Classique, Édition Marabout
- 1964: Ma Discothèque de Variétés, Édition Marabout
- 1967: A la Recherche de la Musique Vivante, Les Éditions de l'Atelier
- Influence du Chant Grégorien sur la Musique, Éditions Labergerie-Mame
- 1969: Encyclopédie des Musiques Sacrées, Tome II
- 1971: Encyclopédie des Musiques Sacrées, Tome III
- Les Musiciens de l'Espérance, André Caplet, Lili Boulanger, Jean Cartan, Éditions Labergerie-Mame

== Honours ==
- Chevalier dans l'Ordre des Palmes Académiques (1968)
- Chevalier dans l'Ordre des Arts et des Lettres (1990)
