= Edmond Lemaigre =

French organist, conductor and composer

Edmond Lemaigre (1849 in Clermont-Ferrand – 22 May 1890 in the 8th arrondissement of Paris) was a 19th-century French organist, conductor and composer.

== Biography ==
Lemaire began his musical studies in his hometown with Charles Renaud de Vilbac (1829–1884).

In 1872, he continued his studies of writing in Paris with Charles-Joseph Vervoitte (1822–1884), Kapellmeister and organist of the Saint-Roch church, and pipe organ with Édouard Batiste.

In 1877 he became the first holder of the new organ (1876/77) of the cathedral of Clermont-Ferrand, inaugurated on May 26, 1877, a position he held until 1888, when he moved to Paris. Aloÿs Claussmann succeeded him at the pulpit.

The organist of the Concerts of the Trocadéro in Paris, Lemaigre played there several of his compositions on the new organ Cavaillé-Coll (1878) of the grand hall.

He succeeded his father at the head of the "Société Lyrique" in 1881, and in 1883 he founded the "Association Artistique du Centre" at Clermont-Ferrand.

== Compositions ==
=== Organ ===
- Twelve pieces for organ, Paris, Leduc (1881):
1. Marche Solennelle in D♭ major
2. Méditation in A♭ major
3. Pastorale in D major
4. Alla Fuga in C major
5. Élégie in C minor
6. Capriccio in F major
7. Andante Religioso in G major
8. Mélodie in E♭ major
9. Prière in G♭ major
10. Deux Préludes (I in E major, II in A minor)
11. En forme de Canon in F major
12. Scherzo in G major.
- New Pieces for organ, in 6 notebooks, Paris, Richault (1885).
  - 1st Cahier
  1. Fragment symphonique (alla polacca) in G minor for organ or orchestra
  2. Andantino in A♭ major
  - 2nd Cahier
  1. Intermezzo in G♭ major
  2. Cantabile in B♭ major
  3. Prélude in C minor
  - 3rd Cahier
  1. Magnificat in F major
  2. Magnificat in D minor
  - 4th Cahier
  1. Offertoire from the Messia by Hændel in D minor/major
  2. Contemplation in G major
  3. Prélude in F major
  - 5th Cahier
  1. Stabat Mater (15 variations) in B♭ major
  2. Canzona pastorale in A minor
  - 6th Cahier
  1. Élégie-Marche in C minor
  2. Élévation in E♭ major
  3. Kyrie of the Messe royale by Dumont
  4. 5 Versets in D minor/F major

=== String orchestra ===
- Contemplation from Fragments symphoniques for strings. Richault, by 1884

=== Orchestra ===
- Danse mauresque from Fragments symphoniques. Richault, 1884

=== Solo piano ===
- Orientale and scherzo-valse. Richault, 1884
