= Lucy Mochi =

Chinese-American adult film actress and model (born 2001)

- Born: March 8, 2001 (age 25); Jiangsu, China
- Occupation: Pornographic film actress
- Website: lucymochihub.com

Lucy Mochi is a Chinese-American adult film actress and model.

As of 2026, she is ranked amongst the top 500 content creators on Pornhub, with over 43 million views.

== Life and career ==
Born on March 8, 2001, in Jiangsu, China. She grew up in Texas. In the U.S., she graduated from high school with honors as valedictorian and completed Advanced Placement (AP) courses. She later enrolled at the University of Texas at Austin, where she studied pre-med with a focus on biochemistry. During her sophomore year, she worked part-time at a student call center and as a waitress, and planned to become a scientist; however, she dropped out of school due to opportunities in the adult entertainment industry.

She began her career anonymously in 2019 at the age of 19, working as a webcam model and posting on Reddit. She later created an OnlyFans page. She remained anonymous until 2020, when she decided to reveal her face.

She later signed a contract with the Spiegler Girls agency and began working with major studios such as Vixen, Blacked, and Jules Jordan.

In May 2026, she was nominated by Pornhub in the "Top Anal Performer" category. In April, she was nominated for an XMA Creator Award. In April, she was named “Pet of the Month” by Penthouse magazine. In August, she made her debut with TeamSkeet, earning the title of “Star of the Month.” In September, she starred in a lesbian scene for Slayed. In October, she made her debut with Evil Angel in a DVD release directed by Johnny Darko.

She ranks among the top 500 Pornhub creators, with over 43 million views.

== Personal life ==
Mochi describes herself as a "bookworm". She is fluent in Mandarin (Chinese) and English. She is a fan of Formula One.

== Awards and nominations ==
Year	Award	Category	Result
2025	Fleshbot Awards	Best New Starlet	Nominated
2025	XBIZ Awards	Best New Starlet	Nominated
2026	Penthouse	Pet of the Month (April)	Won
2026	AVN Awards	Best New Starlet	Nominated
2026	Pornhub Awards	Top Anal Performer	Nominated
2026	XBIZ Awards	Best New Starlet	Nominated
