= Fabio Mochi =

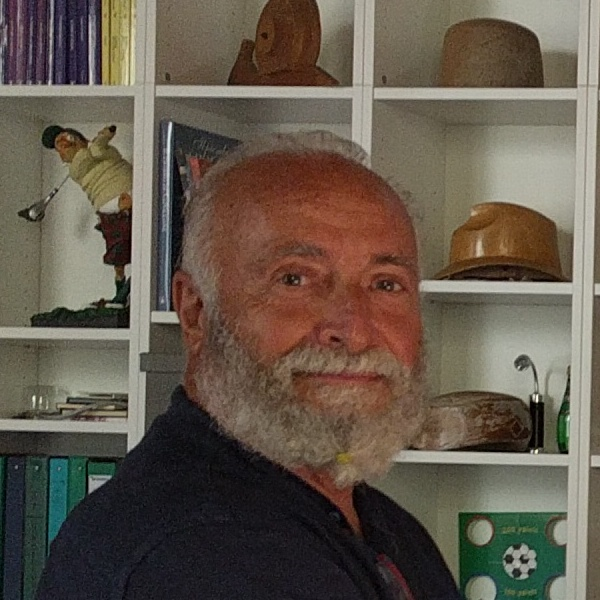
- Mochi in 2020
- Born: Fabio Mochi; Florence, Italy
- Occupation: Designer (co-founder Noè Studio)

Fabio Mochi, aka MOKI, is an Italian designer, illustrator and publisher.

== Biography ==
He obtained his school leaving certificate in artistic studies in 1975. In 1985 he was nominated one of the most promising Tuscan artists by the University of Florence. Two years later, in 1987, he and Paolo Biondi co-founded Noé Studio, which provides graphic, computer graphics and decoration services. In 1993, he took part in the first National Computer-Art Exhibition in Michelangelo Caprese, and in the same year he also collaborated with Ettore Maiotti on the Creative Graphics Courses organized by Fabbri Editori. Six years later, in 1999, he was invited to exhibit his works of traditional and digital techniques at the Florence Art Biennale. In 2005, he worked as an advisor for the Giorgio Morandi Study Centre. Furthermore, from 2007 to 2009, he created illustrations for Findomestic advertisements and also for the "La Fattoria della Cultura" ("The Culture Farm"). He has been a member of the Società Geografica Italiana (Italian Geographic Society) since 2013.

=== Museum and exhibition projects ===
Together with Paolo Biondi he created the logo for Museo Morandi (Morandi Museum) in Bologna in 1993, after which he was appointed to design the communications, signage and publications of numerous Italian museums (Museo Nazionale del Bargello (Bargello Museum), Galleria Palatina, Parchi della Val di Cornia (Val di Cornia Parks), Museo del Tessuto (Textile Museum) in Prato, Palazzo Martinengo Cesaresco Novarino in Brescia, Museo della ceramica(Ceramics Museum) of Montelupo Fiorentino, Museo archeologico di Montelupo (Archaeological Museum), Centro per l'arte contemporanea Luigi Pecci (Modern Art Centre) of Prato, Museo della Vite e del Vino di Montespertoli (Wine and wine-growing Museum), Museo di arte sacra (Sacred Art Museum) (Montespertoli), Palazzo Ducale (Sassuolo), Cenacolo di Andrea del Sarto (Last Supper).

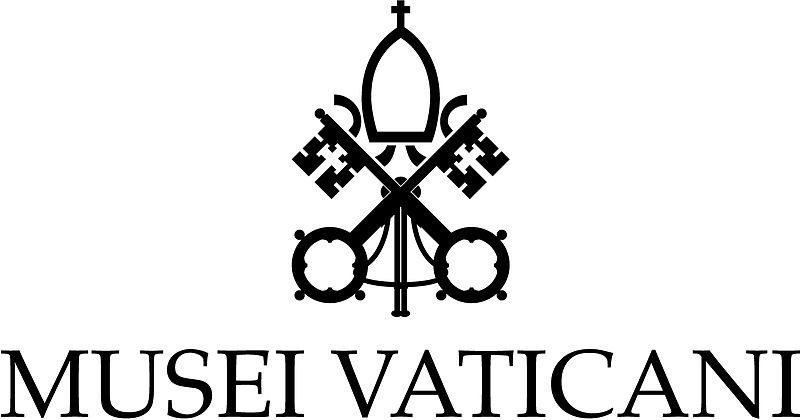
The coat of arms of the Musei Vaticani

Since 2009, together with Paolo Biondi, and under the direction of Antonio Paolucci, he has been educational advisor for the Musei Vaticani (Vatican Museums) for which he redesigned the coat of arms. He also coordinated the team who produced the children travel guide for the Museo Gregoriano Egizio

In 2005, under the direction of Marilena Pasquali, he organised the exhibition of Jean-Michel Folon in Florence which six years later gave rise to the creation of the permanent Folon exhibition in the Giardino delle Rose (Rose Garden) in Florence. Together with Marilena Pasquali he also organised several editions of the Biennale of the Muro Dipinto di Dozza. In 2012 he designed the exhibition "Verso Oriente e ritorno" (To the East and back) in Montelupo Fiorentino as part of the project, "Il mare tra le genti" (The sea among the races). In 2013 he helped organise the exhibition "La Luce del Mondo" (The Light of the World) in San Miniato together with Fausto Berti and Franco Cardini.

In 2014 he finished setting up the MMAB of Montelupo Fiorentino (including the Ceramics Museum and Library) with tactile and experimental elements targeting both young people and the visually impaired. He designed the museum tour of the Florentine Santa Maria Nuova Hospital using new exhibition logics. Also in 2014 he helped prepare the exhibition "Effetto Frana" (Landslide effect) in Montespertoli where one of his works was on display.

=== Publications ===
In 1993 he founded the Noèdizioni together with Paolo Biondi, a publishing company specialized in art volumes such as:

- "Così celesti, così terreni" by Maria Pia Mannini, 2002
- "Il Gran Principe Ferdinando dé Medici e Anton Domenico Gabbiani" by Riccardo Spinelli, 2003
- "Prato Storia e Arte" – since 2005 14 volumes organised by the Fondazione Cariprato
- "La Maestra e la Vita, Maria Maltoni e la scuola di san Gersolè", 2006
- "Zoran Mušič, l'opera su carta" by Marilena Pasquali, 2007 – "Giorgio Morandi, saggi e ricerche 1990–2007" by Marilena Pasquali, 2007
- "Museo Bardini, Cuoi d'Oro" by Guia Rossignoli, 2009 – "La Fattoria della Cultura", 2009 – "Verso Oriente e Ritorno" by Marilena Pasquali, 2012

=== Travel ===
After various trips to Africa and Asia, in 1992 he travelled to Sudan where he followed the itinerary of Carlo Piaggia, following which he organised a photographic exhibition "Il Nilo diviso" (The divided Nile). After trips to Senegal, Mali, Burkina Faso and the Ivory Coast in the footsteps of Mungo Park, in 1994 he organised the exhibition "Un viaggio in Africa Occidentale" (A journey through West Africa) together with Massimo Serandrei, to display wooden works of African art. Numerous pieces from his private collection have been included in various Italian exhibitions, the most recent being "Terre lontane" (Distant lands) in 2009 at the Museo del Tessuto of Prato.

== Bibliography ==
- "Laboratorio Giovani Artisti", published by the University of Florence, 1985
- "Biennale Internazionale dell'Arte Contemporanea", City of Firenze, second edition, 1999
- "Corso di Grafica Creativa", Fratelli Frabbri by Ettore Maiotti, nos. 56/57/58/59/60, 1990
- "Corso di Grafica Creativa", Fratelli Fabbri by Ettore Maiotti, text by Riccardo Saldarelli, no. 59, 1990
- "Il mio primo Morandi" by Umberto Eco, La Repubblica, 5 October 1993
- "Un poster per raccontare Firenze", Turismo notizie, May/June 1995
- "Un marchio per i Parchi", Il Tirreno, 7 June 1998
- "Una guida per Firenze a misura di Capo di Stato", La Repubblica, 16 November 1999
