= John Abbey (organ builder) =

English organ builder (1785–1859)

- Born: 22 December 1785; Whilton, Northamptonshire, England
- Died: 19 February 1859 (aged 73); Versailles, France
- Occupation: Organ builder

John Abbey (22 December 1785 – 19 February 1859) (French: Jean Abbey) was an English organ builder, who built organs for the cathedrals of many French cities, as well as the organ at the Salle Le Peletier of the Paris Opera (1831). Many French organ builders adopted his English bellows design.

== Early life and career ==
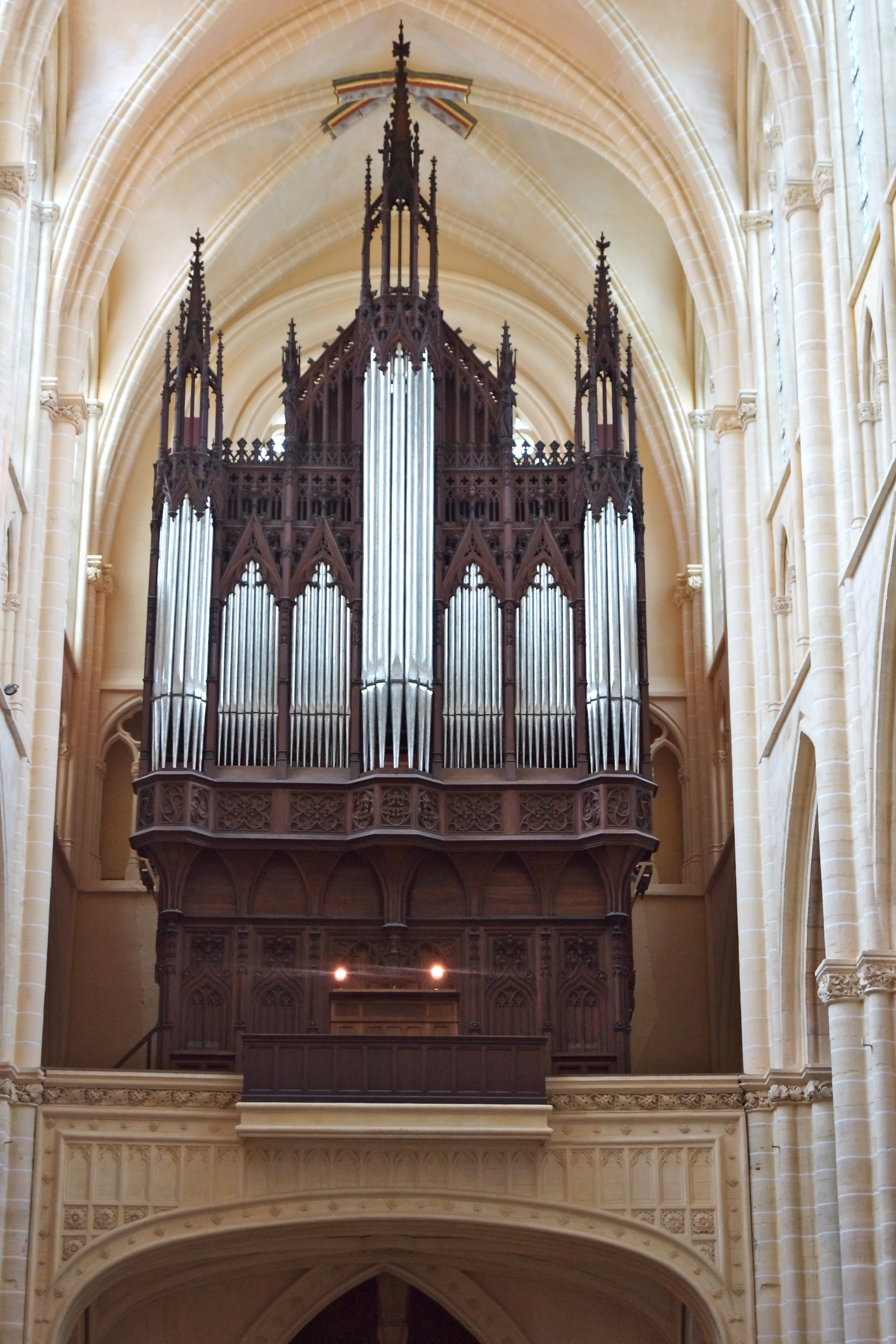
Organ of Châlons Cathedral, delivered in 1849 and housed in a case designed by Jean-Jacques Arveuf-Fransquin

Abbey was born at Whilton, a Northamptonshire village, on 22 December 1785. In his youth, he was an apprentice for James and David Davis, and later for Hugh Russel after 1818, both reputable organ builders in their day. In 1826 Abbey went to Paris, on the invitation of Sébastien Érard, the celebrated harp and pianoforte maker, to work upon an organ which Érard had designed, and which he sent to the Exhibition of the Productions of National Industry in 1827, and also to build an organ for the Convent of the Legion of Honour, at St. Denis. He also built an organ from Érard's design for the chapel of the Tuileries, which, however, had only a short existence, being destroyed in the Revolution of 1830.

Having established himself as an organ-builder in Paris, Abbey became extensively employed in the construction, renovation, and enlargement of organs in France and elsewhere. Amongst others he built choir organs for accompanying voices for the cathedrals of Rheims, Nantes, Versailles, and Évreux, and for the churches of St. Eustache, Saint-Nicholas-des-Champs, St. Elizabeth, St. Medard, St. Etienne du Mont, and St. Thomas Aquinas, in Paris; and large organs for the cathedrals of La Rochelle, Rennes, Viviers, Tulle, Châlons-en-Champagne, Bayeux, and Amiens, and for churches, convents, and chapels at Saint-Denis, Orléans, Caen, Châlons, Picpus, and Versailles. He repaired and enlarged organs in the cathedrals of Mende, Moulins, Rheims, Évreux, and Nevers, and in the churches of Saint-Étienne-du-Mont, Saint-Philippe du Roule, the Assumption, and St. Louis d'Antin in Paris. He also built many organs for Chile and South America. In 1831 Abbey was employed, at the instance of Meyerbeer (who had introduced the instrument into the score of his opera Robert le Diable, then about to be produced), to build an organ for the Grand Opera at Paris, which instrument continued to be used there until it was destroyed, with the theatre, by fire in 1873.

Abbey was the first who introduced into French organs the English mechanism and the bellows invented by Cummins. His example was speedily followed by the French builders, and from that period may be dated the improvements in organ-building which raised the French builders to eminence.

== Death ==
He died at Versailles on 19 February 1859. He left two sons, E. and J. Abbey, to carry on the business of organ-builders in Versailles. His son John Albert Abbey and his grandson John Mary Abbey were also organ builders.
